= Ubilla (disambiguation) =

Ubilla is a town in the Dominican Republic.

Ubilla may also refer to:

== People ==
- Andrés de Ubilla (1540–1603), Roman Catholic prelate
- Emmanuel Ubilla (born 1986), American-Puerto Rican basketball player
- María Cecilia Ubilla (born 1956), Chilean politician
- Sebastián Ubilla (born 1990), Chilean footballer

== Other uses ==
- Estadio Arquitecto Antonio Eleuterio Ubilla, stadium in Uruguay
