= Garcia Ruiz Cabezas =

Most Reverend Garcia Ruiz Cabezas
- Bishop of Cartagena
- Church: Catholic Church
- Diocese: Diocese of Cartagena
- In office: 1654–1658
- Predecessor: Francisco Rodríguez de Valcárcel
- Successor: Antonio Sanz Lozano

Personal details
- Born: 1600 Majadas, Spain
- Died: 1658 (age 58) Cartagena, Colombia

Garcia Ruiz Cabezas (1600–1658) was a Roman Catholic prelate who served as Bishop of Cartagena (1654–1658).

== Biography ==
Garcia Ruiz Cabezas was born in Majadas, Spain in 1600. On 27 Jun 1654, he was appointed during the papacy of Pope Innocent X as Bishop of Cartagena. He served as Bishop of Cartagena until his death in 1658.

== External links and additional sources ==
- Cheney, David M. "Archdiocese of Cartagena". Catholic-Hierarchy.org. (for Chronology of Bishops) ^{[self-published]}
- Chow, Gabriel. "Metropolitan Archdiocese of Cartagena". GCatholic.org. (for Chronology of Bishops) ^{[self-published]}

Catholic Church titles
Preceded by Francisco Rodríguez de Valcárcel	Bishop of Cartagena; 1654–1658	Succeeded by Antonio Sanz Lozano
