= Antonio Sanz Lozano =

Spanish-born prelate (1622–1688)

The Most Reverend Antonio Sanz Lozano
- Archbishop of Santafé en Nueva Granada
- Church: Catholic Church
- Archdiocese: Santafé en Nueva Granada
- Province: Santafé en Nueva Granada
- Appointed: 19 August 1680
- Installed: 22 January 1681
- Term ended: 28 May 1688
- Previous post: Bishop of Cartagena (1661–1680)

Orders
- Consecration: 24 March 1661 by Agustín Muñoz Sandoval

Personal details
- Born: 2 June 1622 Cabanillas del Campo, Spain
- Died: 28 May 1688 (aged 65) Bogotá, Viceroyalty of Peru

Antonio Sanz Lozano (2 June 1622 – 1688) was a Spanish-born prelate of the Catholic Church in the Viceroyalty of Peru in what is now Colombia. From 1661 to 1680, he served as bishop of Cartagena, and from 1680 until his death in 1688, as archbishop of Santafé en Nueva Granada (now the Archdiocese of Bogotá).

== Biography ==
Sanz was born on 2 June 1622 in Cabanillas del Campo, Spain.

On 19 June 1659, Sanz was appointed bishop of Cartagena by Pope Alexander VII at the age of 37. Located in the Viceroyalty of Peru in South America, the Diocese of Cartagena is now part of Colombia. He was confirmed as bishop on 10 November 1659. His episcopal consecration took place on 24 March 1661, with Bishop of Cusco, Agustín Muñoz Sandoval, as the principal consecrator.

On 19 August 1680, Sanz was appointed archbishop of Santafé en Nueva Granada (today the Archdiocese of Bogotá). His term as archbishop began on 22 January 1681. The next year, in 1681, a dispute occurred between the archbishop and President Castillo of New Granada, who ended up banishing Sanz and seizing his powers, to which Sanz responded by excommunicating Castillo.

Sanz died on 28 May 1688, aged 65.

== Episcopal succession ==
While bishop, he was the principal consecrator of:

- Francisco de la Trinidad Arrieta, Bishop of Santa Marta (1662);
- Melchor de Liñán y Cisneros, Bishop of Santa Marta (1665);
- Alfonso Bernardo de los Ríos y Guzmán, Bishop of Santiago de Cuba (1669);
- Lucas Fernández de Piedrahita, Bishop of Santa Marta (1669);
- Antonio de León y Becerra, Bishop of Panamá (1673); and
- Gregorius Jacobus Pastrana, Bishop of Santa Marta (1685).

== Episcopal lineage ==
- Bishop Agustín Muñoz Sandoval
- Archbishop Antonio Sanz Lozano (1661)

== External links and additional sources ==
- Cheney, David M. "Archdiocese of Bogotá". Catholic-Hierarchy.org. (for Chronology of Bishops) ^{[self-published]}
- Chow, Gabriel. "Metropolitan Archdiocese of Bogotá (Colombia)". GCatholic.org. (for Chronology of Bishops) ^{[self-published]}
- Cheney, David M. "Archdiocese of Cartagena". Catholic-Hierarchy.org. (for Chronology of Bishops) ^{[self-published]}
- Chow, Gabriel. "Metropolitan Archdiocese of Cartagena". GCatholic.org. (for Chronology of Bishops) ^{[self-published]}

Catholic Church titles
Preceded by Garcia Ruiz Cabezas	Bishop of Cartagena in Colombia; 1659–1680	Succeeded by Miguel Antonio de Benavides y Piedrola
Preceded by Juan de Arguinao y Gutiérrez	Archbishop of Santafé en Nueva Granada; 1680–1688	Succeeded by Ignacio de Urbina
