= Archdiocese of Coro =

Latin Catholic archdiocese in Venezuela

Coordinates: 11.4075°N 69.6779°W

Archdiocese of Coro Archidioecesis Corensis

Catholic
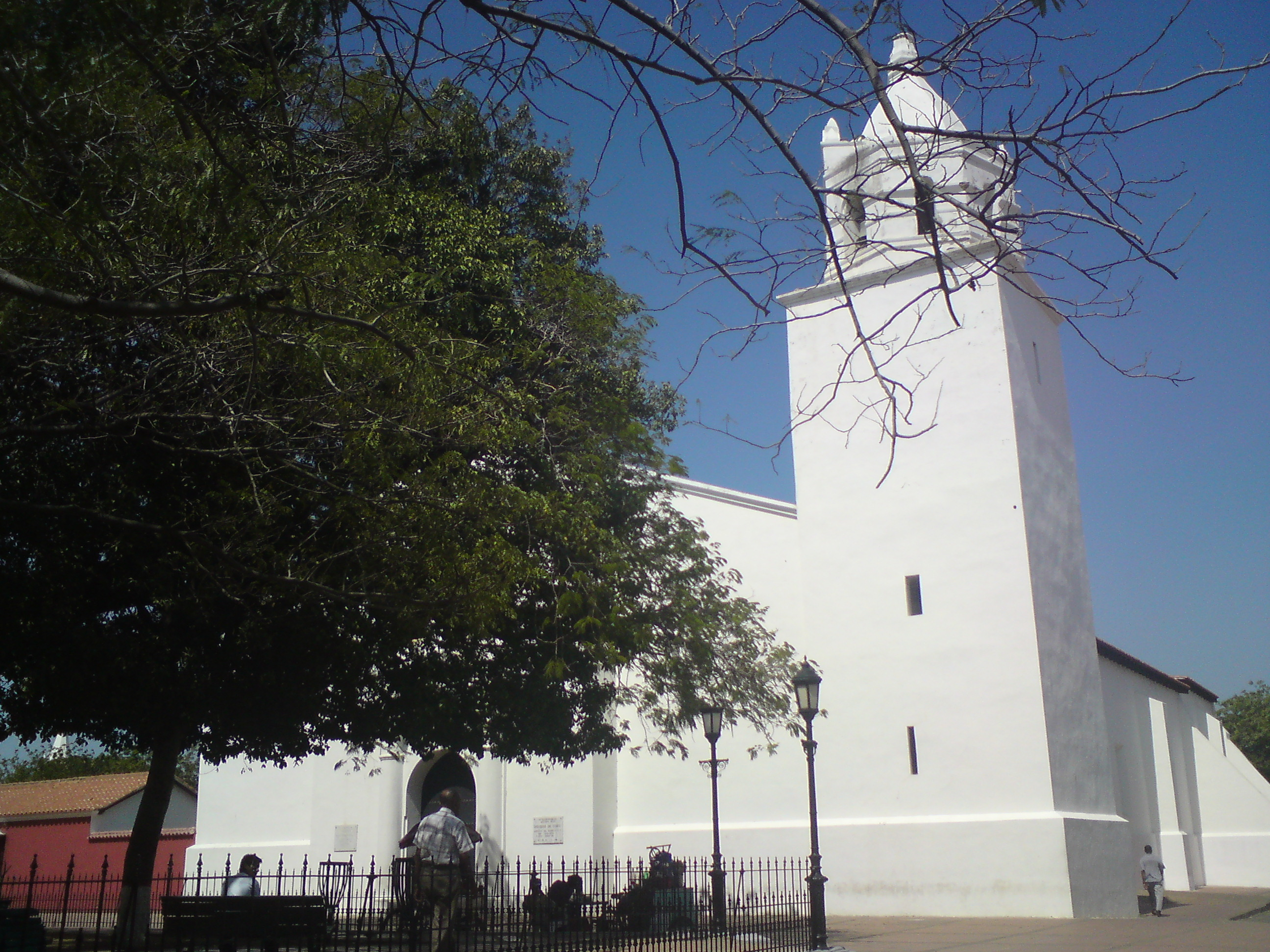
- Cathedral Basilica of Coro

Location
- Country: Venezuela

Statistics
- Area: 21,760 km^{2} (8,400 sq mi)
- Population: Total; Catholics: (as of 2006); 529,000; 458,000 (86.6%)

Information
- Denomination: Catholic Church
- Sui iuris church: Latin Church
- Rite: Roman Rite
- Established: 12 October 1922 (104 years ago)
- Cathedral: Cathedral Basilica of St. Ann

Current leadership
- Pope: Leo XIV
- Archbishop-designate: Victor Hugo Basabe

Map

The Archdiocese of Coro (Latin: Archidioecesis Corensis) is a Latin Church archdiocese of the Catholic Church in western Venezuela.

Its cathedral, the Catedral Basílica de Santa Ana, is a minor basilica. The cathedral is located in the city of (Santa Ana de) Coro, the capital of Falcón State, which has been designated a World Heritage Site ("Coro and its port La Vela").

There is a second minor basilica in La Vela de Coro, the Basílica de Nuestra Señora de Guadalupe de El Carrizal.

== Province ==
Its ecclesiastical province comprises the metropolitan's own archdiocese and a single suffragan bishopric:

- Roman Catholic Diocese of Punto Fijo

== History ==
On 21 June 1531, the first Diocese of Coro was established by Pope Clement VII, on territory split off from the then Diocese of Santo Domingo in the Dominican Republic. That diocese was suppressed on 20 June 1637 and its territory used to establish the Diocese of Caracas (now metropolitan).

On 14 August 1867, Pope Pius IX restored it shortly as the Diocese of Coro y Barquisimeto from the suppressed Diocese of Barquisimeto, joining both titles. Coro was once again suppressed as a see and title when the diocese's name and see were changed back to the Diocese of Barquisimeto on 22 October 1869.

The present Diocese of Coro was established by Pope Pius XI on 12 October 1922. On 13 July 1997 it lost territory to establish its suffragan, the Diocese of Punto Fijo.

The diocese was elevated to Metropolitan Archdiocese of Coro on 23 November 23, 1998.

== Bishops ==
=== Bishops of first diocese ===
Suffragan Bishops of Coro

- Rodrigo de Bastidas y Rodriguez de Romera (21 June 1531 Appointed – 6 July 1541), later Bishop of Puerto Rico (1541.07.06 – retired 1567.05.06)
- Miguel Jerónimo de Ballesteros (Vallesteros) (22 Aug 1546 Appointed – death 1555)
- Juan de Simancas Simancas (12 June 1556 Appointed – 1561.12.05), later Bishop of Cartagena in Colombia (1561.12.05 – death 1570)
- Pedro de Ágreda Sánchez Martín, Dominican Order (O.P.) (27 June 1561 Appointed – death 1580)
- Juan Manual Martínez de Manzanillo, O.P. (23 March 1583 Appointed – death 1 Jan 1592)
- (apparently not consecrated bishop) Pedro Mártir Palomino, O.P. (1 July 1594 Appointed – death 22 Feb 1596)
- Domingo de Salinas, O.P. (10 Nov 1597 Appointed – death 10 June 1600)
- Domingo de Oña, Mercedarians (O. de M.) (27 Aug 1601 Appointed – 27 June 1605), later Bishop of Gaeta (Italy) (1605.02.27 – death 1626.10.13)
- Antonio de Alzega (Alcega), Friars Minor (O.F.M.) (12 Dec 1605 Confirmed – death 13 May 1610
- Juan Bartolomé de Bohorquez e Hinojosa, O.P. (17 Jul 1611 Appointed – 13 Nov 1617), later Bishop of Antequera, Oaxaca (Mexico) (1617.11.13 – 1633.09)
- Gonzalo de Angulo, Order of Minims (O.M.) (20 Nov 1617 Appointed – death 17 May 1633)
- Juan López de Agurto de la Mata (1634.11.20 – 1637.06.20), previously Bishop of Bishop of Puerto Rico (Puerto Rico) ([1630.07.20] 1631.02.10 – 1634.11.20); later Bishop of Caracas (Venezuela) (1637.06.20 – death 1637.12.24)

(Diocese suppressed 1637)

=== Bishops of current diocese ===
==== Suffragan Bishop of Coro y Barquisimeto (Coro and Barquisimeto) ====
- Victor José Díez Navarrete (1868.06.22 – 1869.10.22), later Bishop of Barquisimeto (Venezuela) (1869.10.22 – death 1893)

==== Suffragan Bishops of Coro ====
- Lucas Guillermo Castillo Hernández † (22 June 1923 – 10 Nov 1939); later Titular Archbishop of Rhizæum (1939.11.10 – 1946.05.13) & Coadjutor Archbishop of Caracas (Venezuela) (1939.11.10 – 1946.05.13), succeeding as Metropolitan Archbishop of Caracas (1946.05.13 – 1955.09.09)
- Francisco José Iturriza Guillén, Salesians (S.D.B.) † (10 Nov 1939 – retired 20 May 1980)
- Ramón Ovidio Pérez Morales (20 May 1980 – 23 Dec 1992), also President of Episcopal Conference of Venezuela (1990 – 1996); previously Titular Bishop of Aquæ Albæ in Byzacena (1970.12.02 – 1980.05.20) & Auxiliary Bishop of Caracas (Venezuela) (1970.12.02 – 1980.05.20); later Metropolitan Archbishop of Maracaibo (1992.12.23 – 1999.06.05), Archbishop-Bishop of Los Teques (Venezuela) (1999.06.05 – 2004.12.30)
- Roberto Lückert León (1993.07.21 – 21 July 1993 see below), previously Bishop of Cabimas (Venezuela) (1985.04.27 – 1993.07.21)

==== Metropolitan Archbishops of Coro ====
- Roberto Lückert León (see above 21 July 1993 – 25 Oct 2016); also Apostolic Administrator of his suffragan Punto Fijo (Venezuela) (2014.02.21 – 2016.08.14)
- Mariano José Parra Sandoval (25 Oct 2016 - 31 Oct 2023)
- Victor Hugo Basabe (31 Oct 2023 - present)

=== Another priest of this diocese who became bishop ===
- Jesús Tomás Zárraga Colmenares (priest here, 1985-1997), appointed Bishop of San Carlos de Venezuela in 2003

== See also ==
- Catholic Church in Venezuela

== Source and external links ==
- GCatholic with incumbent biography links
