= Pedro Maldonado =

Pedro Maldonado may refer to:

- Pedro Maldonado (bishop) (died 1566), Spanish Roman Catholic bishop
- Pedro Vicente Maldonado (1704–1748), South-American scientist
- Pedro Vicente Maldonado Canton, town and canton of Ecuador
