= Ignacio de Urbina =

Spanish prelate

The Most Reverend Ignacio de Urbina, OSH
- Archbishop of Santafé
- Church: Roman Catholic Church
- Archdiocese: Santafé
- Province: Santafé en Nueva Granada
- Appointed: 7 November 1689 by Pope Innocent XI
- Installed: 25 September 1690
- Term ended: 9 April 1703
- Predecessor: Antonio Sanz Lozano
- Successor: Francisco de Cosío y Otero

Orders
- Consecration: 14 May 1690 by Miguel Antonio de Benavides y Piedrola

Personal details
- Born: 31 July 1632 Burgos, Castile, Spain
- Died: 9 April 1703 (aged 70) Santafé de Bogotá, New Kingdom of Granada
- Parents: Juan de Urbina Escribano; Francisca Ortiz de Zarate
- Occupation: Visitor; archbishop

Ignacio de Urbina, OSH (31 July 1632 – 9 April 1703) was a Spanish prelate of the Roman Catholic Church in the New Kingdom of Granada and Viceroyalty of New Spain . From 1689 until his death 1703, he served as Archbishop of Santafé de Bogotá. In 1701, he was appointed Bishop of Puebla de los Ángeles, but he declined to accept the role and remained in Santafé de Bogotá, where he died in 1703.

== Biography ==
Urbina was born on 31 July 1632 in Burgos, Spain, to Juan de Urbina Escribano and Francisca Ortiz de Zarate. He joined the Order of St. Jerome (Hieronymites), and became prior of the monasteries in Fres de Val, San Juan de Ortega, and Salamanca. In addition, he served as headmasters of schools in Ávila and Sigüenza. He later was appointed visitor for his order in Spain.

=== Archbishop of Bogotá ===
On 7 November 1689, Urbina was appointed Archbishop of Santafé en Nueva Granada (now the Archdiocese of Bogotá) by Pope Innocent XI. He was consecrated to this position on 14 May 1690, with Miguel Antonio de Benavides y Piedrola, Bishop of Cartagena, serving as principal consecrator. He took possession of the archdiocese on 26 September 1690. Due to poor health, he was unable to visit many parts of the archdiocese, so he appointed visitors to oversee these areas. In addition, he worked to improve religious discipline among the diocesan clergy and religious orders. He also helped restore the Bogotá Cathedral and installed in it a second organ. He was also the principal consecrator of two bishops during his episcopacy: Pedro Díaz de Cienfuegos in 1692, and Mateo Panduro y Villafaña, OCD in 1699.

On 18 April 1701, Urbana was appointed by Pope Clement XI as Bishop of Puebla de los Ángeles in the Viceroyalty of New Spain, but he did not accept the position and never took possession of the diocese. He died in Bogotá on 9 April 1703 at the age of 70.

== Episcopal lineage ==
- Miguel Antonio de Benavides y Piedrola (1681)
- Ignacio de Urbina, OSH (1690)

== External links and additional sources ==
- Cheney, David M. "Archdiocese of Bogotá". Catholic-Hierarchy.org. (for Chronology of Bishops) ^{[self-published]}
- Chow, Gabriel. "Metropolitan Archdiocese of Bogotá (Colombia)". GCatholic.org. (for Chronology of Bishops) ^{[self-published]}
- Cheney, David M. "Archdiocese of Puebla de los Ángeles, Puebla". Catholic-Hierarchy.org. (for Chronology of Bishops) ^{[self-published]}
- Chow, Gabriel. "Metropolitan Archdiocese of Puebla de los Ángeles". GCatholic.org. (for Chronology of Bishops) ^{[self-published]}
