= Diocese of Verapaz =

Diocese of the Catholic Church in Guatemala

Diocese of Verapaz Dioecesis Verae Pacis

Location
- Country: Guatemala
- Ecclesiastical province: Province of Guatemala City

Statistics
- Area: 11,810 km^{2} (4,560 sq mi)
- Population: Total; Catholics: (as of 2010); 1,318,000; 1,119,000 (84.9%)
- Parishes: 34

Information
- Denomination: Roman Catholic
- Rite: Latin Rite
- Established: 27 July 1921 (104 years ago)
- Cathedral: Catedral de Santo Domingo de Guzmán

Current leadership
- Pope: Leo XIV
- Bishop: Rodolfo Valenzuela Núñez

Map
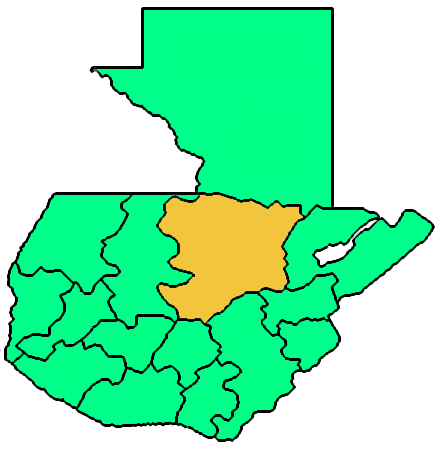

The Roman Catholic Diocese of Verapaz (also Vera Paz, Cobán) is a Latin suffragan diocese in the ecclesiastical province of the Archdiocese of Guatemala.

Its cathedral episcopal see is the Catedral de Santo Domingo de Guzman, dedicated to Saint Dominic of Guzman, at Cobán, in Alta Verapaz.

== History ==
It was erected a first time on 1561.06.21 as Diocese of Verapaz, on territory split off from the then Roman Catholic Diocese of Guatemala, as a suffragan of the Metropolitan Mexico, but was suppressed on 1603.06.23.

It was restored on 27 July 1921 albeit demoted, as the Apostolic Vicariate of Verapaz and Petén, on territory split off from the meanwhile Metropolitan Archdiocese of Guatemala, a missionary pre-diocesan jurisdiction, exempt (directly subject to the Holy See, not yet part of an ecclesiastical province).

On 14 January 1935, it was promoted as Diocese of Vera Paz, also known after its see as Diocese of Cobán. On 1951.03.10, it lost territory to establish the then Apostolic Administration of El Petén.

On Tuesday, 22 July 2014, according to the official Daily Bulletin of the Holy See Press Office for the day (which also lists papal appointments and resignations, as part of the Vatican's website), Pope Francis appointed the incumbent Bishop of Verapaz, Cobán, Rodolfo Valenzuela Núñez, to a five-year-long, renewable term as a Member of the Pontifical Council for Promoting Christian Unity.

== Bishops ==
=== Episcopal ordinaries ===
Colonial Suffragan Bishops of Verapaz

- Pedro (de) Angulo, O.P. (1561.07.27 – death 1562.04.01)
- Pedro de la Peña, O.P. (1564.03.01 – 1565.05.15 Appointed, Bishop of Quito)
- Tomás de Cárdenas, O.P. (1574.01.08 – death 1578)
- Antonio de Hervias, Dominican Order (O.P.) (1579.01.09 – 1587.09.28), previously Bishop of Arequipa (Peru) (1577.04.15 – 1579.01.09), later Bishop of Cartagena (Colombia) (1587.09.28 – death 1590)
- Juan Fernández de Rosillo (1592.06.12 – 1603.06.16), later Bishop of Michoacán (Mexico) (1603.06.16 – death 1606.10.29)

Apostolic Vicars of Verapaz

?

- Luis Durou y Sure, Lazarists (C.M.), Apostolic Administrator 1928.11.12 – 1935.01.14), while Metropolitan Archbishop of Guatemala (Guatemala) (1928.06.30 – 1938.12.17)

Modern Suffragan Bishops of Verapaz

- José Luis Montenegro y Flores (1935.01.23 – death 1945.05.23)
- Raymundo Julian Martín, O.P. (1945.11.14 – 1966.05.28), previously Titular Bishop of Trocmades (1944.05.26 – 1945.11.14) & Auxiliary Bishop of Vera Paz 1944.05.26 – 1945.11.14); also Apostolic Administrator ad nutum Sanctae Sedis of El Petén (Guatemala) (1951.03.10 – 1956); later Titular Bishop of Turris in Proconsulari (1966.05.28 – 1975.12.08)
- Juan José Gerardi Conedera (1967.05.05 – 1974.08.22), also President of Episcopal Conference of Guatemala (1972–1978); later Bishop of Santa Cruz del Quiché (Guatemala) (1974.08.22 – 1984.08.14), President of Episcopal Conference of Guatemala (1980–1982), Titular Bishop of Guardialfiera (1984.08.14 – 1998.04.26) & Auxiliary Bishop of Guatemala (Guatemala) (1984.08.14 – 1998.04.26)
- Gerardo Humberto Flores Reyes (1977.10.07 – 2001.02.22), previously Auxiliary Bishop of Quetzaltenango, Los Altos (Guatemala) (1966.07.26 – 1969.05.09) & Titular Bishop of Nova Cæsaris (1966.07.26 – 1977.10.07), Apostolic Administrator of Izabal (Guatemala) (1969.05.09 – 1977.10.07); also President of Episcopal Conference of Guatemala (1992–1994)
- Rodolfo Valenzuela Núñez (2001.02.22 – ...), also President of Episcopal Conference of Guatemala (2012.03 – ...); succeeding as former Coadjutor Bishop of Vera Paz (1997.02.19 – 2001.02.22)

=== Coadjutor bishop ===
- Rodolfo Valenzuela Núñez (1997-2001)

=== Auxiliary bishops ===
- Raimundo María Julián Manguán-Martín y Delgado, O.P. (1944-1945), appointed Bishop here
- Humberto Lara Mejía (1957-1967), appointed Bishop of Santa Cruz del Quiché

== Sources and external links ==
- Cheney, David M. "Diocese of Verapaz". Catholic-Hierarchy.org. (for Chronology of Bishops) ^{[self-published]}
- Chow, Gabriel. "Diocese of Verapaz (Guatemala)". GCatholic.org. (for Chronology of Bishops) ^{[self-published]}
