= Diocese of Montería =

Diocese of the Catholic Church in Colombia

Diocese of Montería Dioecesis Monteriensis

Catholic

Location
- Country: Colombia
- Ecclesiastical province: Cartagena

Statistics
- Area: 14,550 km^{2} (5,620 sq mi)
- Population: Total; Catholics: (as of 2004); 1,510,000; 1,310,000 (86.8%)

Information
- Denomination: Catholic Church
- Rite: Latin Rite
- Established: 20 November 1954 (71 years ago)
- Cathedral: Catedral de San Jerónimo

Current leadership
- Pope: Leo XIV
- Bishop: Rubén Darío Jaramillo Montoya
- Metropolitan Archbishop: Francisco Javier Múnera Correa, I.M.C.

Map

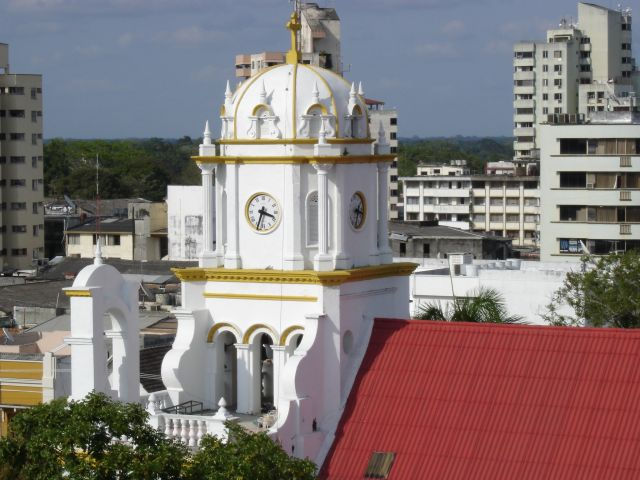
Cathedral of St. Jerome

The Roman Catholic Diocese of Montería (Latin: Monteriesis) is a diocese located in the city of Montería in the ecclesiastical province of Cartagena in Colombia.

== History ==
- 20 November 1954: Established as Diocese of Montería from the Metropolitan Archdiocese of Cartagena and Apostolic Vicariate of San Jorge

== Ordinaries ==
- Rubén Isaza Restrepo (1956.11.04 – 1959.11.02) Appointed, Bishop of Ibagué
- José de Jesús Pimiento Rodríguez (1959.12.30 – 1964.02.29) Appointed, Bishop of Garzón-Neiva; future Cardinal
- Miguel Antonio Medina y Medina (1964.03.23 – 1972.05.20)
- Samuel Silverio Buitrago Trujillo, C.M. (1972.12.18 – 1976.10.11) Appointed, Archbishop of Popayán
- Carlos José Ruiseco Vieira (1977.03.28 – 1983.09.23) Appointed, Archbishop of Cartagena
- Ramón Darío Molina Jaramillo, O.F.M. (1984.03.23 – 2001.01.19) Appointed, Bishop of Neiva
- Julio César Vidal Ortiz (2001.10.31 – 2011.07.16) Appointed, Bishop of Cúcuta
- Ramón Alberto Rolón Güepsa (2012.10.27 – 2025.06.06) Appointed, Bishop of Chiquinquirá
  - Sede Vacante; Apostolic Administrator: Farly Yovany Gil Betancur (2025.07.31 – 2026.03.14) Bishop of Montelíbano
- Rubén Darío Jaramillo Montoya (2026.02.14 – Present)

== See also ==
- Roman Catholicism in Colombia
