= Domingo de Ulloa =

Spanish Catholic bishop (died 1601)

Most Reverend Domingo de Ulloa
- Bishop of Michoacán
- Church: Catholic Church
- Diocese: Diocese of Michoacán
- In office: 1598–1601
- Predecessor: Alfonso Guerra
- Successor: Andrés de Ubilla
- Previous posts: Bishop of Nicaragua (1585–1591); Bishop of Popayán (1591–1598)

Orders
- Consecration: 1586

Personal details
- Born: Toro, Spain
- Died: 1601 Morelia, Mexico

Domingo de Ulloa, O.P. (died 1601) was a Roman Catholic prelate who served as Bishop of Michoacán (1598–1601), Bishop of Popayán (1591–1598), and Bishop of Nicaragua (1585–1591).

== Biography ==
Domingo de Ulloa was born in Toro, Spain and ordained a priest in the Order of Preachers. On 4 February 1585, he was appointed during the papacy of Pope Gregory XIII as Bishop of Nicaragua and ordained bishop in 1586 in Spain. On 9 December 1591, he was appointed during the papacy of Pope Gregory XIII as Bishop of Popayán On 3 April 1598, he was appointed during the papacy of Pope Clement VIII as Bishop of Michoacán where he served until his death in 1601.

While bishop, he was the principal consecrator of Antonio Calderón de León, Bishop of Puerto Rico (1597), and Juan de Labrada, Bishop of Cartagena (1597).

== External links and additional sources ==
- Cheney, David M. "Diocese of León en Nicaragua". Catholic-Hierarchy.org. (for Chronology of Bishops) ^{[self-published]}
- Chow, Gabriel. "Diocese of León (Nicaragua)". GCatholic.org. (for Chronology of Bishops) ^{[self-published]}
- Cheney, David M. "Diocese of Popayán". Catholic-Hierarchy.org. (for Chronology of Bishops) ^{[self-published]}
- Chow, Gabriel. "Metropolitan Diocese of Popayán (Colombia)". GCatholic.org. (for Chronology of Bishops) ^{[self-published]}
- Cheney, David M. "Archdiocese of Morelia". Catholic-Hierarchy.org. (for Chronology of Bishops) ^{[self-published]}
- Chow, Gabriel. "Metropolitan Archdiocese of Morelia (Mexico)". GCatholic.org. (for Chronology of Bishops) ^{[self-published]}

Catholic Church titles
Preceded by Antonio de Zayas (bishop)	Bishop of Nicaragua; 1585–1591	Succeeded by Jerónimo de Escobar
Preceded by Agustín Gormaz Velasco	Bishop of Popayán; 1591–1598	Succeeded by Juan de La Roca
Preceded by Alfonso Guerra (bishop)	Bishop of Michoacán; 1598–1601	Succeeded by Andrés de Ubilla
