= Arévalos =

Arévalos is a Spanish surname. Notable people with the surname include:

- Lourdes Arévalos (born 1984), Paraguayan model
- Myriam Arévalos (born 1993), Paraguayan model
- Pedro Arévalos (?–1572), Spanish bishop
