= Rubén Isaza Restrepo =

Colombian apostolic administrator

- Archbishop of Cartagena
- Church: Catholic Church
- Archdiocese: Archdiocese of Cartagena
- In office: 3 October 1974 – 15 March 1983
- Predecessor: José Ignacio López Umaña
- Successor: Carlos José Ruiseco Vieira
- Previous posts: Coadjutor Archbishop of Cartagena (1967-1974); Titular Bishop of Lares (1964-1974); Coadjutor Archbishop of Bogotá (1964-1967); Bishop of Ibagué (1959-1964); Bishop of Montería (1956-1959); Titular Bishop of Badiae (1952-1956); Auxiliary Bishop of Cartagena (1952-1956)

Orders
- Ordination: 29 October 1939
- Consecration: 19 March 1953 by Luis Concha Córdoba

Personal details
- Born: 20 March 1916 Salamina, Caldas Department, Colombia
- Died: 9 March 1987 (aged 70) Manizales, Caldas Department, Colombia

Monsignor Rubén Isaza Restrepo (born 20 March 1916, in Salamina – died 9 March 1987, in Manizales) was the first apostolic administrator of the Diocese of Ibagué, leading it from 1960 to 1964.

== Biography ==
He was, at the time, the youngest bishop in Colombia since he was Auxiliary Bishop of Cartagena, who began to lead the diocese 20 February 1955 at the consecration of Paolo Bertoli, an ambassador of Pius XII. Born in Salamina, Caldas, Caldas, he died in Manizales in 1986. His remains rest in Manizales' cathedral. At the time of his death, he was Archbishop Emeritus of Cartagena.

== External links and additional sources ==
- Cheney, David M. "Archdiocese of Cartagena". Catholic-Hierarchy.org. (for Chronology of Bishops)^{self-published}
- Chow, Gabriel. "Metropolitan Archdiocese of Cartagena". GCatholic.org. (for Chronology of Bishops)^{self-published}
