= Antonio Avendaño y Paz =

Spanish Roman Catholic prelate

Most Reverend Antonio Avendaño y Paz
- Bishop of Quito
- Church: Catholic Church
- Diocese: Diocese of Quito
- In office: 1588–1590
- Predecessor: Pedro de la Peña
- Successor: Luis López de Solís
- Previous post: Bishop of Quito (1588–1590)

Orders
- Ordination: 1550 by Jerónimo de Loaysa
- Consecration: 9 February 1567

Personal details
- Born: 1520 Salamanca, Spain
- Died: 7 November 1590 (age 70) Quito, Ecuador

Antonio Avendaño y Paz, O.F.M. or Bishop Antonio de San Miguel Avendaño y Paz (1520 – 7 November 1590) was a Roman Catholic prelate who served as Bishop of Quito (1588–1590) and Bishop of La Imperial (1564–1588).

== Biography ==
Antonio Avendaño y Paz was born in Salamanca, Spain in 1520 and ordained a priest in the Order of Friars Minor in 1550. On 22 March 1564, he was appointed during the papacy of Pope Pius IV as the first Bishop of La Imperial. On 9 February 1567, he was consecrated bishop by Jerónimo de Loaysa, Archbishop of Lima, with Pedro de la Peña, Bishop of Quito, as co-consecrator, and Father Bartolomé Martinez Menacho y Mesa, assisting. On 17 September 1568, he was installed as Bishop of Concepción. On 9 March 1588, he was appointed during the papacy of Pope Sixtus V as Bishop of Quito. He served as Bishop of Quito until his death on 7 November 1590.

While bishop, he was the principal consecrator of Diego de Medellín, Bishop of Santiago de Chile (1577); and the principal co-consecrator of Alfonso Guerra, Bishop of Paraguay (1582).

== External links and additional sources ==
- Cheney, David M. "Archdiocese of Concepción (Santissima Concezione)". Catholic-Hierarchy.org. (for Chronology of Bishops) ^{[self-published]}
- Chow, Gabriel. "Titular Episcopal See of La Imperial (Chile)". GCatholic.org. (for Chronology of Bishops) ^{[self-published]}
- Chow, Gabriel. "Metropolitan Archdiocese of Concepción (Chile)". GCatholic.org. (for Chronology of Bishops) ^{[self-published]}
- Chow, Gabriel. "Metropolitan Archdiocese of Concepción (Chile)". GCatholic.org. (for Chronology of Bishops) ^{[self-published]}
- Cheney, David M. "Archdiocese of Quito". Catholic-Hierarchy.org. (for Chronology of Bishops) ^{[self-published]}

Catholic Church titles
Preceded by None	Bishop of La Imperial; 1564–1588	Succeeded by Agustín de Cisneros Montesa
Preceded by Pedro de la Peña	Bishop of Quito; 1588–1564	Succeeded by Luis López de Solís
