= Francisco Ortega (bishop) =

Most Reverend Francisco Ortega
- Bishop of Nueva Caceres
- Church: Catholic Church
- Diocese: Diocese of Nueva Caceres
- In office: 1599–1602
- Predecessor: Luis Maldonado (bishop)
- Successor: Baltazar de Cobarrubias y Múñoz

Orders
- Consecration: 1600

Personal details
- Died: 1602 Nueva Caceres

Francisco Ortega (died 1602) was a Roman Catholic prelate who served as Bishop of Nueva Caceres (1599–1602).

== Biography ==
Francisco Ortega was ordained a priest in the Order of Saint Augustine. On 13 September 1599, he was appointed during the papacy of Pope Clement VIII as Bishop of Nueva Caceres. In 1600, he was consecrated bishop. He served as Bishop of Nueva Caceres until his death in 1602.

== External links and additional sources ==
- Cheney, David M. "Archdiocese of Caceres (Nueva Caceres)". Catholic-Hierarchy.org. (for Chronology of Bishops) ^{[self-published]}
- Chow, Gabriel. "Metropolitan Archdiocese of Caceres". GCatholic.org. (for Chronology of Bishops) ^{[self-published]}

Catholic Church titles
Preceded by Luis Maldonado (bishop)	Bishop of Nueva Caceres; 1599–1602	Succeeded by Baltazar de Cobarrubias y Múñoz
