= Juan de Cervantes (bishop) =

Mexican bishop (1553–1614)

Most Reverend Juan de Cervantes
- Bishop of Antequera
- Church: Catholic Church
- Diocese: Diocese of Antequera
- In office: 1608–1614
- Predecessor: Baltazar de Cobarrubias y Múñoz
- Successor: Juan Bartolome de Bohórquez e Hinojosa

Orders
- Consecration: 3 May 1609 by Alfonso de la Mota y Escobar

Personal details
- Born: 24 June 1553 Mexico
- Died: 13 September 1614 (aged 61) Antequera, Oaxaca, Mexico

Juan de Cervantes (24 June 1553 – 13 September 1614) was a Roman Catholic prelate. He served as the Bishop of Antequera (1608–1614).

== Biography ==
Juan de Cervantes was born in Mexico on the 24 of June, 1553. On the 28 of May 1608, he was appointed during the papacy of Pope Paul V as Bishop of Antequera. On the 3 of May 1609, he was consecrated bishop by Alfonso de la Mota y Escobar, who was the Bishop of Tlaxcala. He served as Bishop of Antequera until his death on the 13 of September,1614.

== See also ==
- Catholic Church in Mexico

== External links and additional sources ==
- Cheney, David M. "Archdiocese of Antequera, Oaxaca". Catholic-Hierarchy.org. (for Chronology of Bishops) ^{[self-published]}
- Chow, Gabriel. "Metropolitan Archdiocese of Antequera". GCatholic.org. (for Chronology of Bishops) ^{[self-published]}

Catholic Church titles
Preceded by Baltazar de Cobarrubias y Múñoz	Bishop of Antequera; 1608–1614	Succeeded by Juan Bartolomé de Bohorquez e Hinojosa
