= Antonio de Hervias =

Most Reverend Antonio de Hervias
- Bishop of Cartagena
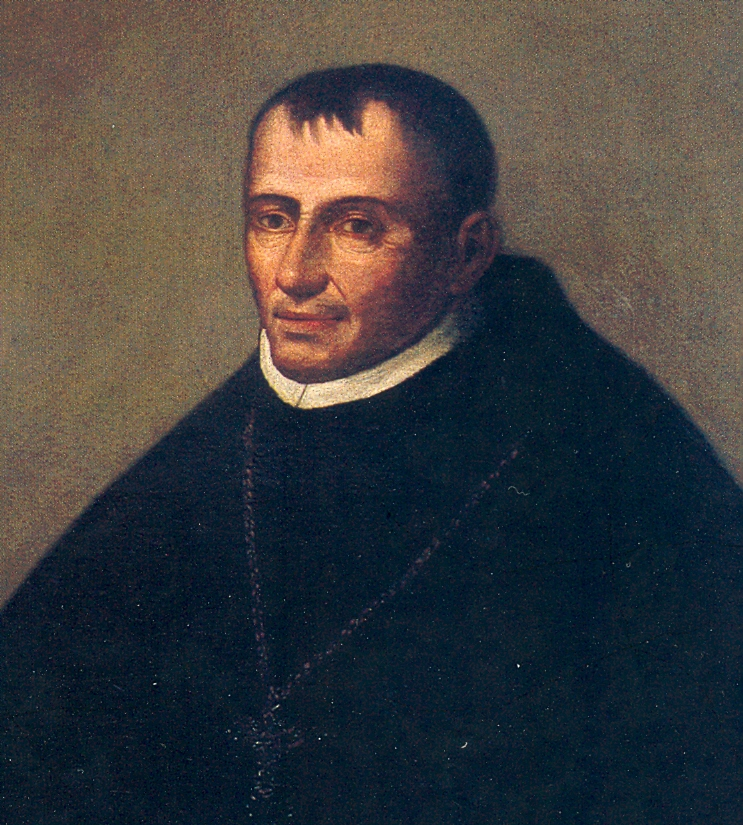
- Church: Catholic Church
- Archdiocese: Archdiocese of Cartagena
- In office: 1587–1590
- Predecessor: Juan Montalvo
- Successor: Juan de Labrada
- Previous posts: Bishop of Verapaz (1579–1587); Bishop of Arequipa (1577–1579)

Personal details
- Died: 28 September 1587 Cartagena, Colombia

Antonio de Hervias, O.P. (died in 1590), was a Roman Catholic prelate who served as Archbishop of Cartagena (1587–1590), Bishop of Verapaz (1579–1587), and the first Bishop of Arequipa (1577–1579).

== Biography ==
Son of Marcos de Hervias and Ana Calderón, he studied at the Colegio de San Gregorio of Valladolid, and he studied at the convent of Sant Esteve in Salamanca.

Antonio de Hervias was ordained a priest in the Order of Preachers.

- On 15 April 1577 he was selected by the King of Spain and confirmed by Pope Gregory XIII as Bishop of Arequipa.
- On 9 January 1579 he was selected by the King of Spain and confirmed by Pope Gregory XIII as Bishop of Verapaz.
- On 28 September 1587 he was selected by the King of Spain and confirmed by Pope Sixtus V as Archbishop of Cartagena where he served until his death on 28 September 1587.

== External links and additional sources ==
- Cheney, David M. "Archdiocese of Arequipa". Catholic-Hierarchy.org. (for Chronology of Bishops) ^{[self-published]}
- Chow, Gabriel. "Metropolitan Archdiocese of Arequipa". GCatholic.org. (for Chronology of Bishops) ^{[self-published]}
- Cheney, David M. "Diocese of Verapaz". Catholic-Hierarchy.org. (for Chronology of Bishops) ^{[self-published]}
- Chow, Gabriel. "Diocese of Verapaz (Guatemala)". GCatholic.org. (for Chronology of Bishops) ^{[self-published]}
- Cheney, David M. "Archdiocese of Cartagena". Catholic-Hierarchy.org. (for Chronology of Bishops) ^{[self-published]}
- Chow, Gabriel. "Metropolitan Archdiocese of Cartagena". GCatholic.org. (for Chronology of Bishops) ^{[self-published]}

Catholic Church titles
Preceded by None	Bishop of Arequipa; 1577–1579	Succeeded by Cristóbal Rodríguez Juárez
Preceded by Tomás de Cárdenas	Bishop of Verapaz; 1579–1587	Succeeded by Juan Fernández de Rosillo
Preceded by Juan Montalvo (bishop)	Archbishop of Cartagena; 1587–1590	Succeeded by Juan de Labrada
