= Juan Manual Martínez de Manzanillo =

Most Reverend Juan Manual Martínez de Manzanillo
- Bishop of Coro
- Church: Catholic Church
- Diocese: Diocese of Coro
- In office: 1583–1592
- Predecessor: Pedro de Ágreda Sánchez Martín
- Successor: Pedro Mártir Palomino

Personal details
- Died: 1592 Coro, Venezuela

Juan Manual Martínez de Manzanillo, O.P. (died 1592) was a Roman Catholic prelate who served as Bishop of Coro (1583–1592).

== Biography ==
Juan Manual Martínez de Manzanillo was ordained a priest in the Order of Preachers. On 23 March 1583, he was appointed during the papacy of Pope Gregory XIII as Bishop of Coro. He served as Bishop of Coro until his death on 1 January 1592.

== External links and additional sources ==
- Cheney, David M. "Archdiocese of Caracas, Santiago de Venezuela". Catholic-Hierarchy.org. (for Chronology of Bishops) ^{[self-published]}
- Chow, Gabriel. "Metropolitan Archdiocese of Coro". GCatholic.org. (for Chronology of Bishops) ^{[self-published]}

Catholic Church titles
Preceded by Pedro de Ágreda Sánchez Martín	Bishop of Coro; 1583–1592	Succeeded by Pedro Mártir Palomino
