= Miguel Jerónimo de Ballesteros =

Most Reverend Miguel Jerónimo de Ballesteros
- Bishop of Coro
- Church: Catholic Church
- Diocese: Bishop of Coro
- Predecessor: Rodrigo de Bastidas y Rodriguez de Romera
- Successor: Juan de Simancas Simancas

Personal details
- Died: 1555 Santa Ana de Coro

Miguel Jerónimo de Ballesteros (also Miguel Jerónimo de Vallesteros) (died 1555) was a Roman Catholic prelate who served as the second Bishop of Coro (1546–1555).

== Biography ==
Bishop Miguel Jerónimo de Ballesteros (Vallesteros) served as the dean of the Cathedral of Cartagena. On August 22, 1546, he was appointed by the King of Spain and confirmed by Pope Paul III as the second Bishop of Coro where he served until his death in 1555. He was a leading activist with the Counter Reformation in the New World.

== External links and additional sources ==
- Cheney, David M. "Archdiocese of Caracas, Santiago de Venezuela". Catholic-Hierarchy.org. (for Chronology of Bishops) ^{[self-published]}
- Chow, Gabriel. "Metropolitan Archdiocese of Coro". GCatholic.org. (for Chronology of Bishops) ^{[self-published]}

Religious titles
Preceded by Rodrigo de Bastidas y Rodriguez de Romera	Bishop of Coro; 1546–1555	Succeeded by Juan de Simancas Simancas
