= Pedro Matías (bishop) =

Roman Catholic prelate (??–1615)

Most Reverend Pedro Matías
- Bishop Elect of Nueva Caceres
- Church: Catholic Church
- Diocese: Diocese of Nueva Caceres
- In office: 1612–1615
- Predecessor: Pedro de Godinez
- Successor: Diego Guevara

Personal details
- Died: 1615

Pedro Matías, O.F.M. (died 1615) was a Roman Catholic prelate who was appointed as Bishop of Nueva Caceres (1612–1615).

== Biography ==
Pedro Matías was ordained a priest in the Order of Friars Minor. On 17 September 1612, he was appointed during the papacy of Pope Paul V as Bishop of Nueva Caceres. He died before he was consecrated in 1615.

== External links and additional sources ==
- Cheney, David M. "Archdiocese of Caceres (Nueva Caceres)". Catholic-Hierarchy.org. (for Chronology of Bishops) ^{[self-published]}
- Chow, Gabriel. "Metropolitan Archdiocese of Caceres (Philippines)". GCatholic.org. (for Chronology of Bishops) ^{[self-published]}

Catholic Church titles
Preceded by Pedro de Godinez	Bishop Elect of Nueva Caceres; 1612–1615	Succeeded by Diego Guevara
