= Francisco Rodríguez de Valcárcel =

17th-century Roman Catholic bishop

Most Reverend Francisco Rodríguez de Valcárcel
- Church: Catholic Church
- In office: 1649–1651
- Predecessor: Cristóbal Pérez Lazarraga y Maneli Viana
- Successor: Garcia Ruiz Cabezas

Personal details
- Born: 23 May 1590 Zamora, Spain
- Died: 18 Jun 1651 (age 61)

Francisco Rodríguez de Valcárcel (23 May 1590 – 18 Jun 1651) was a Roman Catholic prelate who served as Bishop of Cartagena (1649–1651).

== Biography ==
Francisco Rodríguez de Valcárcel was born on 23 May 1590 in Zamora, Spain. On 28 Jun 1649, he was appointed during the papacy of Pope Innocent X as Bishop of Cartagena. On 4 Sep 1650, he was consecrated bishop by Juan de Espinoza y Orozco, Bishop of Santa Marta. He served as Bishop of Cartagena until his death on 18 Jun 1651.

== External links and additional sources ==
- Cheney, David M. "Archdiocese of Cartagena". Catholic-Hierarchy.org. (for Chronology of Bishops) ^{[self-published]}
- Chow, Gabriel. "Metropolitan Archdiocese of Cartagena". GCatholic.org. (for Chronology of Bishops) ^{[self-published]}

Catholic Church titles
Preceded by Cristóbal Pérez Lazarraga y Maneli Viana	Bishop of Cartagena; 1649–1651	Succeeded by Garcia Ruiz Cabezas
