= Gonzalo de Angulo =

Spanish prelate (1577–1633)

Most Reverend Gonzalo de Angulo
- Bishop of Coro
- Church: Catholic Church
- In office: 1617–1633
- Predecessor: Juan Bartolome de Bohórquez e Hinojosa
- Successor: Juan López de Agurto de la Mata

Orders
- Consecration: 1618 by Juan Bartolomé de Bohorquez e Hinojosa

Personal details
- Born: 1577 Valladolid, Spain
- Died: 17 May 1633 (age 56) Coro, Venezuela

Gonzalo de Angulo, O.M. (1577 – 17 May 1633) was a Roman Catholic prelate who served as Bishop of Coro (1617–1633).

== Biography ==
Gonzalo de Angulo was born in Valladolid, Spain in 1577 and ordained a priest in the Order of the Minims. On 20 November 1617, he was appointed during the papacy of Pope Paul V as Bishop of Coro. In 1618, he was consecrated bishop by Juan Bartolomé de Bohorquez e Hinojosa, Bishop of Antequera. He served as Bishop of Coro until his death on 17 May 1633.

While bishop, he was the principal consecrator of Pedro de Oviedo Falconi, Archbishop of Santo Domingo (1621).

== See also ==
- Catholic Church in Venezuela

== External links and additional sources ==
- Cheney, David M. "Archdiocese of Caracas, Santiago de Venezuela". Catholic-Hierarchy.org. (for Chronology of Bishops) ^{[self-published]}
- Chow, Gabriel. "Metropolitan Archdiocese of Coro". GCatholic.org. (for Chronology of Bishops) ^{[self-published]}

Catholic Church titles
Preceded by Juan Bartolomé de Bohorquez e Hinojosa	Bishop of Coro; 1617–1633	Succeeded by Juan López de Agurto de la Mata
