= Pedro Mártir Palomino =

Roman Catholic prelate

Most Reverend Pedro Mártir Palomino
- Bishop-Elect of Coro
- Church: Catholic Church
- Diocese: Roman Catholic Archdiocese of Coro
- In office: 1594–1596
- Predecessor: Juan Manual Martínez de Manzanillo
- Successor: Domingo de Salinas

Personal details
- Died: 22 February 1596 Coro, Venezuela

Pedro Mártir Palomino, O.P. (died 1596) was a Roman Catholic prelate who served as Bishop-Elect of Coro (1594–1596).

== Biography ==
Pedro Mártir Palomino was ordained a priest in the Order of Preachers. On 1 July 1594, he was appointed during the papacy of Pope Clement VIII as Bishop of Coro. He was never consecrated and died as Bishop-Elect of Coro on 22 February 1596.

== External links and additional sources ==
- Cheney, David M. "Archdiocese of Caracas, Santiago de Venezuela". Catholic-Hierarchy.org. (for Chronology of Bishops) ^{[self-published]}
- Chow, Gabriel. "Metropolitan Archdiocese of Coro". GCatholic.org. (for Chronology of Bishops) ^{[self-published]}

Catholic Church titles
| Preceded by Juan Manual Martínez de Manzanillo | Bishop-Elect of Coro; 1594–1596 | Succeeded by Domingo de Salinas |
