= Diego Gómez de Lamadrid =

Spanish archbishop

Most Reverend Diego Gómez de Lamadrid
- Archbishop of Badajoz
- Church: Catholic Church
- Diocese: Roman Catholic Diocese of Badajoz
- In office: 1578–1601
- Predecessor: Diego de Simancas
- Successor: Andrés Fernández de Córdoba y Carvajal
- Previous post: Archbishop of Lima (1577–1578)

Personal details
- Born: 1529 Potes Spain
- Died: August 15, 1601 (age 72)

Diego Gómez de Lamadrid, O.SS.T. (1529 – August 15, 1601) was a Roman Catholic prelate who served as Archbishop of Badajoz (1578–1601) and then second Archbishop of Lima (1577–1578).

== Biography ==
Diego Gómez de Lamadrid was born in Potes Spain and ordained a priest in then Trinitarian Order. On March 27, 1577, Pope Gregory XIII, appointed him then second Archbishop of Lima replacing Jerónimo de Loayza. On June 13, 1577, Pope Gregory XIII, appointed him as Archbishop (personal title) of then Diocese of Badajoz where he served until his death on August 15, 1601. His successor in Lima was Saint Turibius de Mogrovejo.

== External links and additional sources ==
- Cheney, David M. "Archdiocese of Lima". Catholic-Hierarchy.org. (for Chronology of Bishops) ^{[self-published]}
- Chow, Gabriel. "Metropolitan Archdiocese of Lima (Peru)". GCatholic.org. (for Chronology of Bishops) ^{[self-published]}
- Cheney, David M. "Archdiocese of Mérida–Badajoz". Catholic-Hierarchy.org. (for Chronology of Bishops) ^{[self-published]}
- Chow, Gabriel. "Metropolitan Archdiocese of Mérida–Badajoz". GCatholic.org. (for Chronology of Bishops) ^{[self-published]}

Catholic Church titles
Preceded by Jerónimo de Loayza	Archbishop of Lima; 1577–1578	Succeeded by Saint Turibius de Mogrovejo
Preceded by Diego de Simancas	Archbishop of Badajoz; 1578–1601	Succeeded by Andrés Fernández de Córdoba y Carvajal
