= Diego Torres Altamirano =

Most Reverend Diego Torres Altamirano
- Bishop of Cartagena in Colombia
- Church: Catholic Church
- Diocese: Diocese of Cartagena in Colombia
- In office: 1618–1621
- Predecessor: Pedro Vega
- Successor: Francisco Sotomayor

Orders
- Consecration: 28 Oct 1618 by Bartolomé Lobo Guerrero

Personal details
- Born: 1557 Trujillo, Spain
- Died: 10 Dec 1621 (age 64) Cartagena, Colombia

Diego Torres Altamirano, O.F.M. (1557–1621) was a Roman Catholic prelate who served as Bishop of Cartagena in Colombia (1618–1621).

== Biography ==
Diego Torres Altamirano was born in Trujillo, Spain and ordained a priest in the Order of Friars Minor. On 26 Jun 1617, he was appointed during the papacy of Pope Paul V as Bishop of Cartagena in Colombia. On 28 Oct 1618, he was consecrated bishop by Bartolomé Lobo Guerrero, Archbishop of Lima. He served as Bishop of Cartagena in Colombia until his death on 10 Dec 1621.

While bishop, he was the principal consecrator of Ambrosio Vallejo Mejia, Bishop of Popayán (1620) .

== External links and additional sources ==
- Cheney, David M. "Archdiocese of Cartagena". Catholic-Hierarchy.org. (for Chronology of Bishops) ^{[self-published]}
- Chow, Gabriel. "Metropolitan Archdiocese of Cartagena". GCatholic.org. (for Chronology of Bishops) ^{[self-published]}

Catholic Church titles
Preceded by Pedro Vega	Bishop of Cartagena; 1618–1621	Succeeded by Francisco Sotomayor
