= Dionisio de Santos =

Most Reverend Dionisio de Santos
- Bishop of Cartagena
- Church: Catholic Church
- In office: 1574–1577
- Predecessor: Pedro Arévalos
- Successor: Juan Montalvo

Orders
- Consecration: Dec 1575 by Luis Zapata de Cárdenas

Personal details
- Born: Spain
- Died: 9 September 1577 Cartagena, Colombia

Dionisio de Santos, O.P. (died 1577) was a Roman Catholic prelate who served as Bishop of Cartagena (1574–1577).

== Biography ==
Dionisio de Santos was born in Spain and ordained a priest in the Order of Preachers. On 25 Jun 1574, he was appointed during the papacy of Pope Gregory XIII as Bishop of Cartagena. On Dec 1575, he was consecrated bishop by Luis Zapata de Cárdenas, Archbishop of Santafé en Nueva Granada. He served as Bishop of Cartagena until his death on 9 Sep 1577.

== External links and additional sources ==
- Cheney, David M. "Archdiocese of Cartagena". Catholic-Hierarchy.org. (for Chronology of Bishops) ^{[self-published]}
- Chow, Gabriel. "Metropolitan Archdiocese of Cartagena". GCatholic.org. (for Chronology of Bishops) ^{[self-published]}

Catholic Church titles
Preceded by Pedro Arévalos	Bishop of Cartagena; 1574–1577	Succeeded by Juan Montalvo
