= Juan de Labrada =

Most Reverend Juan de Labrada
- Bishop of Cartagena
- Church: Catholic Church
- Diocese: Diocese of Cartagena
- In office: 1597–1613
- Predecessor: Antonio de Hervias
- Successor: Pedro Vega

Orders
- Consecration: Dec 1597 by Domingo de Ulloa

Personal details
- Born: Granada, Spain

Juan de Labrada, O.P. (died 1613) was a Roman Catholic prelate who served as Bishop of Cartagena (1597–1613).

== Biography ==
Juan de Labrada was born in Granada, Spain and ordained a priest in the Order of Preachers. On 29 Jan 1597, he was appointed during the papacy of Pope Alexander VI as Bishop of Cartagena. On Dec 1597, he was consecrated bishop by Domingo de Ulloa, Bishop of Popayán. He served as Bishop of Cartagena until his death on 22 Jul 1613.

== External links and additional sources ==
- Cheney, David M. "Archdiocese of Cartagena". Catholic-Hierarchy.org. (for Chronology of Bishops) ^{[self-published]}
- Chow, Gabriel. "Metropolitan Archdiocese of Cartagena". GCatholic.org. (for Chronology of Bishops) ^{[self-published]}

Catholic Church titles
Preceded by Antonio de Hervias	Bishop of Cartagena; 1597–1613	Succeeded by Pedro Vega
