= Pedro de la Peña =

Most Reverend Pedro de la Peña
- Bishop of Quito
- Church: Catholic Church
- Diocese: Diocese of Quito
- In office: 1565–1583
- Predecessor: García Díaz Arias
- Successor: Antonio Avendaño y Paz
- Previous post: Bishop of Verapaz (1564–1565)

Orders
- Consecration: 18 October 1565 by Gaspar Zúñiga Avellaneda

Personal details
- Died: 7 March 1583 Quito, Ecuador

Pedro de la Peña, O.P. (died 7 March 1583) was a Roman Catholic prelate who served as the second Bishop of Quito (1565–1583) and the second Bishop of Verapaz (1564–1565).

== Biography ==
Antonio de Hervias was ordained a priest in the Order of Preachers. On 1 Mar 1564, he was selected by the King of Spain and confirmed by Pope Pius IV as Bishop of Verapaz. On 15 May 1565, he was selected by the King of Spain and confirmed by Pope Pius IV as Bishop of Quito. On 18 October 1565, he was consecrated bishop by Gaspar Zúñiga Avellaneda, Archbishop of Santiago de Compostela with Diego de Covarrubias y Leiva, Bishop of Segovia, and Melchor Alvarez de Vozmediano, Bishop of Guadix, serving as co-consecrators. He served as Bishop of Quito until his death on 7 March 1583.

While bishop, he was the principal co-consecrator of Antonio Avendaño y Paz, Bishop of Concepción (1567).

== External links and additional sources ==
- Cheney, David M. "Diocese of Verapaz". Catholic-Hierarchy.org. (for Chronology of Bishops) ^{[self-published]}
- Chow, Gabriel. "Diocese of Verapaz (Guatemala)". GCatholic.org. (for Chronology of Bishops) ^{[self-published]}
- Chow, Gabriel. "Metropolitan Archdiocese of Concepción (Chile)". GCatholic.org. (for Chronology of Bishops) ^{[self-published]}
- Cheney, David M. "Archdiocese of Quito". Catholic-Hierarchy.org. (for Chronology of Bishops) ^{[self-published]}

Catholic Church titles
| Preceded by Pedro de Angulo | Bishop of Verapaz; 1564–1565 | Succeeded by Tomás de Cárdenas |
| Preceded by García Díaz Arias | Bishop of Quito; 1565–1583 | Succeeded by Antonio Avendaño y Paz |
