= Diocese of Montelíbano =

Diocese of the Catholic Church in Colombia

Diocese of Montelíbano Dioecesis Monslibanensis

Catholic

Location
- Country: Colombia
- Ecclesiastical province: Cartagena

Statistics
- Area: 11,500 km^{2} (4,400 sq mi)
- Population: Total; Catholics: (as of 2012); 300,000; 280,000 (93%)

Information
- Rite: Latin Rite
- Established: 12 June 1924 (102 years ago)
- Cathedral: Catedral de la Santa Cruz

Current leadership
- Pope: Leo XIV
- Bishop: Farly Yovany Gil Betancur
- Metropolitan Archbishop: Jorge Enrique Jiménez Carvajal, C.I.M.

Map

Website
- www.diocesisdemontelibano.org

The Roman Catholic Diocese of Montelíbano (Latin: Monslibanensis) is a diocese located in the city of Montelíbano in the ecclesiastical province of Cartagena in Colombia. It has 38 priests and 31 religious.

== History ==
- 12 June 1924: Established as Apostolic Prefecture of Sinú from the Metropolitan Archdiocese of Cartagena
- 12 January 1931 Renamed as Apostolic Prefecture of Sinú-San Jorge
- 10 March 19500: Promoted as Apostolic Vicariate of San Jorge
- 25 April 1969: Promoted as Territorial Prelature of Alto Sinú
- 29 December 1998: Promoted as Diocese of Montelíbano

== Leadership, in reverse chronological order ==
- Bishops of Montelíbano (Roman rite), below
  - Bishop Farly Yovany Gil Betancur (2020.03.04 - )
  - Bishop Luis José Rueda Aparicio (2012.02.02 - 2018.05.19), appointed Archbishop of Popayán
  - Bishop Edgar de Jesús Garcia Gil (2002.10.28 – 2010.05.24), appointed Bishop of Palmira
  - Bishop Julio César Vidal Ortiz (1998.12.29 – 2001.10.31), appointed Bishop of Montería; see below
- Prelates of Alto Sinú (Roman rite), below
  - Bishop Julio César Vidal Ortiz (1993.12.16 – 1998.12.29); see above
  - Bishop Flavio Calle Zapata (1989.02.16 – 1993.02.16), appointed Bishop of Sonsón-Rionegro; future Archbishop
  - Bishop Alfonso Sánchez Peña, C.M.F. (1969.07.28 – 1989.02.16)
- Vicars Apostolic of San Jorge (Roman rite), below
  - Bishop Eloy Tato Losada, I.E.M.E. (1960.05.03 – 1969.04.25), appointed Bishop of Magangué
  - Bishop José Lecuona Labandibar, I.E.M.E. (1958.07.04 – 1959.10.20)
  - Bishop Francisco Santos Santiago, P.I.M.E. (1950.03.12 – 1957.12.25)
- Prefect Apostolic of Sinú-San Jorge (Roman rite), below
  - Fr. Marcellino Lardizábal Aguirrebengoa, I.E.M.E. (1931.01.12 – 1949); see below
- Prefect Apostolic of Sinú (Roman rite), below
  - Fr. Marcellino Lardizábal Aguirrebengoa, I.E.M.E. (1925.03.04 – 1931.01.12); see above

== See also ==
- Roman Catholicism in Colombia
