= Gregorio de Beteta =

Roman Catholic prelate

Most Reverend Gregorio de Beteta
- Bishop-Elect of Cartagena
- Church: Catholic Church
- Diocese: Diocese of Cartagena
- In office: 1552–1562
- Predecessor: Francisco de Santa María Benavides Velasco
- Successor: Juan de Simancas Simancas

Personal details
- Died: 1562

Gregorio de Beteta, O.P. (died 1562) was a Roman Catholic prelate who served as Bishop-Elect of Cartagena, Colombia from 1552 to 1562.

== Biography ==
Gregorio de Beteta was ordained a priest in the Order of Preachers. On 28 June 1552 he was appointed during the papacy of Pope Julius III as Bishop of Cartagena. In 1556, he resigned before he was consecrated bishop. He died in 1562 as Bishop-Elect of Cartagena.

== External links and additional sources ==
- Cheney, David M. "Archdiocese of Cartagena". Catholic-Hierarchy.org. (for Chronology of Bishops) ^{[self-published]}
- Chow, Gabriel. "Metropolitan Archdiocese of Cartagena". GCatholic.org. (for Chronology of Bishops) ^{[self-published]}

Catholic Church titles
Preceded by Francisco de Santa María Benavides Velasco	Bishop-Elect of Cartagena; 1552–1562	Succeeded by Juan de Simancas Simancas
