= Tomás de Toro =

Most Reverend Tomás de Toro
- Bishop-Elect of Cartagena
- Church: Catholic Church
- Diocese: Diocese of Cartagena
- Predecessor: None
- Successor: Jerónimo de Loaysa

Personal details
- Died: 1536

Tomás de Toro, O.P. (died 1536) was a Roman Catholic prelate who served as Bishop-Elect of Cartagena (1534–1536).

== Biography ==
Tomás de Toro was born ordained a priest in the Order of Preachers at the Convent of San Esteban de Salamanca. On 24 Apr 1534, he was appointed during the papacy of Pope Clement VII as the first Bishop of Cartagena. His bishopric was brief, for he died two years later, after facing serious struggles with the trustees, headed by Pedro de Heredia, due to its excesses with the Indians. He died in 1536 before he was consecrated as Bishop of Cartagena.

== External links and additional sources ==
- Cheney, David M. "Archdiocese of Cartagena". Catholic-Hierarchy.org. (for Chronology of Bishops) ^{[self-published]}
- Chow, Gabriel. "Metropolitan Archdiocese of Cartagena". GCatholic.org. (for Chronology of Bishops) ^{[self-published]}

Catholic Church titles
Preceded by None	Bishop-Elect of Cartagena; 1534–1536	Succeeded by Jerónimo de Loaysa
