= Miguel Antonio de Benavides y Piedrola =

Spanish Roman Catholic prelate

Most Reverend Miguel Antonio de Benavides y Piedrola
- Bishop of Cartagena
- Church: Catholic Church
- Diocese: Diocese of Cartagena in Colombia
- In office: 1681–1713
- Predecessor: Antonio Sanz Lozano
- Successor: Antonio María Casiani

Personal details
- Born: 1643 Jaén, Spain
- Died: Feb 1713 (age 70) Barcelona, Spain?

Miguel Antonio de Benavides y Piedrola (1643 – February 1713) was a Roman Catholic prelate who served as Bishop of Cartagena (1681–1713).

== Biography ==
Miguel Antonio de Benavides y Piedrola was born in Jaén, Spain in 1643. On 3 March 1681, he was appointed during the papacy of Pope Innocent XI as Bishop of Cartagena. He served as Bishop of Cartagena until his death in February 1713.

== Episcopal succession ==
While bishop, he was the principal consecrator of:

- Diego Ladrón de Guevara, Bishop of Panamá (1689);
- Ignacio de Urbina, Archbishop of Santafé en Nueva Granada (1690);

and the principal co-consecrator of:

- Michele Maria Dentice, Bishop of Mottola (1697);
- Filippo de Cordova (de' duchi di Suessa), Bishop of Guardialfiera (1697);
- Giuseppe Rottario (Rovero), Bishop of Alba-Pompea (1697);
- Giovanni Fontana, Bishop of Cesena (1697);
- Giuseppe Antonio Bertodano, Bishop of Vercelli (1697);
- Tomaso Giustiniani, Bishop of Chios (1700); and
- Isidoro Bertrán Garcia, Archbishop of Tarragona (1712).

== External links and additional sources ==
- Cheney, David M. "Archdiocese of Cartagena". Catholic-Hierarchy.org. (for Chronology of Bishops) ^{[self-published]}
- Chow, Gabriel. "Metropolitan Archdiocese of Cartagena". GCatholic.org. (for Chronology of Bishops) ^{[self-published]}

Catholic Church titles
Preceded by Antonio Sanz Lozano	Bishop of Cartagena; 1681–1713	Succeeded by Antonio María Casiani
