= Tomás de Cárdenas =

16th-century Roman Catholic prelate

Most Reverend Tomás de Cárdenas
- Bishop of Verapaz
- Church: Catholic Church
- Diocese: Diocese of Verapaz
- In office: 1574–1578
- Predecessor: Pedro de la Peña
- Successor: Antonio de Hervias

Personal details
- Died: 1578 Verapaz, Guatemala

Tomás de Cárdenas, O.P. (died 1578) was a Roman Catholic prelate who served as the third Bishop of Verapaz (1574–1578).

== Biography ==
Tomás de Cárdenas was ordained a priest in the Order of Preachers. On 8 January 1574, he was selected by the King of Spain and confirmed by Pope Gregory XIII as Bishop of Verapaz. He served as Bishop of Verapaz until his death in 1578.

== See also ==
- Catholic Church in Guatemala

== External links and additional sources ==
- Cheney, David M. "Diocese of Verapaz". Catholic-Hierarchy.org. (for Chronology of Bishops) ^{[self-published]}
- Chow, Gabriel. "Diocese of Verapaz (Guatemala)". GCatholic.org. (for Chronology of Bishops) ^{[self-published]}

Catholic Church titles
Preceded by Pedro de la Peña	Bishop of Verapaz; 1564–1565	Succeeded by Antonio de Hervias
