= Juan Montalvo (bishop) =

Most Reverend Juan Montalvo
- Bishop of Cartagena
- Church: Catholic Church
- Diocese: Diocese of Cartagena
- In office: 1578–1586
- Predecessor: Dionisio de Santos
- Successor: Antonio de Hervias

Orders
- Consecration: 1579

Personal details
- Born: Arévalo, Spain
- Died: 10 September 1586 Cartagena, Colombia

Juan Montalvo, O.P. or Juan de Montalvo (died 1586) was a Roman Catholic prelate who served as Bishop of Cartagena (1578–1586).

== Biography ==
Juan Montalvo was born in Arévalo, Spain and ordained a priest in the Order of Preachers. On 6 Oct 1578, he was appointed during the papacy of Pope Gregory XIII as Bishop of Cartagena. In 1579, he was consecrated bishop. He served as Bishop of Cartagena until his death on 10 Sep 1586.

== External links and additional sources ==
- Cheney, David M. "Archdiocese of Cartagena". Catholic-Hierarchy.org. (for Chronology of Bishops) ^{[self-published]}
- Chow, Gabriel. "Metropolitan Archdiocese of Cartagena". GCatholic.org. (for Chronology of Bishops) ^{[self-published]}

Catholic Church titles
Preceded by Dionisio de Santos	Bishop of Cartagena; 1578–1586	Succeeded by Antonio de Hervias
