= Juan de Simancas Simancas =

Roman Catholic prelate

Most Reverend Juan de Simancas Simancas
- Bishop of Cartagena
- Church: Catholic Church
- Diocese: Diocese of Cartagena
- In office: 1561–1570
- Predecessor: Gregorio de Beteta
- Successor: Pedro Arévalos
- Previous post: Bishop-Elect of Coro (1556–1561)

Orders
- Consecration: April 1564 by Juan de los Barrios

Personal details
- Born: Cordoba, Spain
- Died: 1570 Spain

Juan de Simancas Simancas (died 1570) was a Roman Catholic prelate who served as Bishop of Cartagena (1561–1570) and Bishop-Elect of Coro (1556–1561).

== Biography ==
Juan de Simancas Simancas was born in Cordoba, Spain, the son of Diego de Simancas Bretón and María de Simancas, and the brother of Diego de Simancas, Bishop of Zamora. He attended the Universidad de Bolonia. On 12 Jun 1556, he was appointed by Pope Paul IV as Bishop of Coro. In 1560, he arrived in New Spain to be consecrated but was instead appointed on 5 December 1561 during the papacy of Pope Pius IV as Bishop of Cartagena and not consecrated bishop until April 1564 by Juan de los Barrios, Archbishop of Santafé en Nueva Granada.

Soon after his consecration, tensions rose with the then governor, Juan del Busto, over a free mulatto woman who had been enslaved and fled to the bishop for sanctuary to which he granted. The governor demanded the return of the woman and when Simancas refused, he charged the bishop with theft and put the city under martial law; in response the bishop excommunicated the governor. The situation was also aggravated by the priestly community which had refused to absolve any encomiendos (settlers) of their sins via confession until they returned property stolen from the Indians; a stance the bishop supported. The situation soon escalated with the Indian population refusing to work and instead fleeing to the churches for sanctuary and the governor and his successor, Martin, violently removed them by force. Simancas then excommunicated the lieutenant governor, Francisco de Salazar, for publicly living in concubinage with Marian de las Casas. Salazar responded by physically assaulting the bishop's emissary. The situation became so heated that Simancas was forced to sail to Spain to seek the mediation of the King which resolved the situation. However, the conflict so exhausted Simancas that he resigned without license in 1569 and returned to Spain where he died in 1570. He is buried in the Capilla del Espíritu Santo.

While bishop, he was the principal co-consecrator of Pedro de Ágreda Sánchez Martín, Bishop of Coro (1565).

== External links and additional sources ==
- Cheney, David M. "Archdiocese of Caracas, Santiago de Venezuela". Catholic-Hierarchy.org. (for Chronology of Bishops) ^{[self-published]}
- Chow, Gabriel. "Metropolitan Archdiocese of Coro". GCatholic.org. (for Chronology of Bishops) ^{[self-published]}
- Cheney, David M. "Archdiocese of Cartagena". Catholic-Hierarchy.org. (for Chronology of Bishops) ^{[self-published]}
- Chow, Gabriel. "Metropolitan Archdiocese of Cartagena". GCatholic.org. (for Chronology of Bishops) ^{[self-published]}

Catholic Church titles
Preceded by Miguel Jerónimo de Ballesteros	Bishop-Elect of Coro; 1556–1561	Succeeded by Pedro de Ágreda Sánchez Martín
Preceded by Gregorio de Beteta	Bishop of Cartagena; 1561–1570	Succeeded by Pedro Arévalos
