= Baltazar de Cobarrubias y Múñoz =

Mexican Catholic bishop (1560–1622)

The Most Reverend Baltazar de Covarrubias y Múñoz
- Church: Catholic Church
- Diocese: Diocese of Michoacán
- In office: 1608–1622
- Predecessor: Juan Fernández de Rosillo
- Successor: Alonso Orozco Enriquez de Armendáriz Castellanos y Toledo
- Previous posts: Bishop of Nueva Caceres (1603–1605); Bishop of Antequera (1605–1608)

Orders
- Consecration: 1603 by Diego de Romano y Govea

Personal details
- Born: 1560 Mexico City
- Died: 22 July 1622 (aged 61–62) Michoacán, Mexico

Baltazar de Covarrubias y Múñoz, O.S.A. (1560 – 22 July 1622) was a Roman Catholic prelate who served as Bishop of Michoacán (1608–1622), Bishop of Antequera (1605–1608), and Bishop of Nueva Caceres (1603–1605).

== Biography ==
Baltazar de Covarrubias y Múñoz was born in Mexico City in 1560 and ordained a priest in the Order of Saint Augustine. On 10 September 1601, he was selected by the King of Spain as Bishop of Paraguay but was soon replaced by Martín Ignacio de Loyola who was appointed by the Pope on 19 November 1601. On 13 January 1603, he was appointed during the papacy of Pope Clement VIII as Bishop of Nueva Caceres. In 1603, he was consecrated bishop by Diego de Romano y Govea, Bishop of Tlaxcala. On 6 June 1605, he was appointed during the papacy of Pope Paul V as Bishop of Antequera. On 4 February 1608, he was appointed during the papacy of Pope Paul V as Bishop of Michoacán. He served as Bishop of Michoacán until his death on 22 July 1622.

== External links and additional sources ==
- Cheney, David M. "Archdiocese of Caceres (Nueva Caceres)". Catholic-Hierarchy.org. (for Chronology of Bishops) ^{[self-published]}
- Chow, Gabriel. "Metropolitan Archdiocese of Caceres (Philippines)". GCatholic.org. (for Chronology of Bishops) ^{[self-published]}
- Cheney, David M. "Archdiocese of Antequera, Oaxaca". Catholic-Hierarchy.org. (for Chronology of Bishops) ^{[self-published]}
- Chow, Gabriel. "Metropolitan Archdiocese of Antequera (Mexico)". GCatholic.org. (for Chronology of Bishops) ^{[self-published]}
- Cheney, David M. "Archdiocese of Morelia". Catholic-Hierarchy.org. (for Chronology of Bishops) ^{[self-published]}
- Chow, Gabriel. "Metropolitan Archdiocese of Morelia (Mexico)". GCatholic.org. (for Chronology of Bishops) ^{[self-published]}

Catholic Church titles
Preceded by Francisco Ortega (bishop)	Bishop of Nueva Caceres; 1603–1605	Succeeded by Pedro de Godinez
Preceded by Bartolomé de Ledesma	Bishop of Antequera; 1605–1608	Succeeded by Juan de Cervantes (bishop)
Preceded by Juan Fernández de Rosillo	Bishop of Michoacán; 1608–1622	Succeeded by Alonso Orozco Enriquez de Armendáriz Castellanos y Toledo
