= Domingo de Salinas =

Bishop of Coro from 1597 to 1600

Most Reverend Domingo de Salinas
- Bishop of Coro
- Church: Catholic Church
- In office: 1597–1600
- Predecessor: Pedro Mártir Palomino
- Successor: Domingo de Oña

Orders
- Consecration: 1598

Personal details
- Born: 1547 Spain
- Died: 10 June 1600 (age 53) Coro, Venezuela

Domingo de Salinas, O.P. (1547–1600) was a Roman Catholic prelate who served as Bishop of Coro (1597–1600).

== Biography ==
Domingo de Salinas was born in Spain in 1547 and ordained a priest in the Order of Preachers. On 10 November 1597, he was appointed during the papacy of Pope Clement VIII as Bishop of Coro. In 1598, he was consecrated bishop. He served as Bishop of Coro until his death on 10 June 1600.

== External links and additional sources ==
- Cheney, David M. "Archdiocese of Caracas, Santiago de Venezuela". Catholic-Hierarchy.org. (for Chronology of Bishops) ^{[self-published]}
- Chow, Gabriel. "Metropolitan Archdiocese of Coro". GCatholic.org. (for Chronology of Bishops) ^{[self-published]}

Catholic Church titles
Preceded by Pedro Mártir Palomino	Bishop of Coro; 1597–1600	Succeeded by Domingo de Oña
