= Francisco de Santa María Benavides Velasco =

Roman Catholic prelate

Most Reverend Francisco de Santa María Benavides Velasco
- Bishop of Segovia
- Church: Catholic Church
- Diocese: Diocese of Segovia
- In office: 1558–1560
- Predecessor: Gaspar Zúñiga Avellaneda
- Successor: Martín Pérez de Ayala
- Previous posts: Bishop of Cartagena (1541–1550); Bishop of Mondoñedo (1550–1558)

Orders
- Consecration: 2 August 1541

Personal details
- Died: 15 May 1560 Segovia, Spain

Francisco de Santa María Benavides Velasco, O.S.H. (died 1560) was a Roman Catholic prelate who served as Bishop of Segovia (1558–1560), Bishop of Mondoñedo (1550–1558), and Bishop of Cartagena (1541–1550).

== Biography ==
Francisco de Santa María Benavides Velasco was ordained a priest in the Order of Saint Jerome. On 20 July 1541, he was appointed during the papacy of Pope Paul III as Bishop of Cartagena. On 2 August 1541, he was consecrated bishop. On 17 July 1550, he was appointed during the papacy of Pope Julius III as Bishop of Mondoñedo. On 21 October 1558, he was appointed during the papacy of Pope Paul IV as Bishop of Segovia. He served as Bishop of Segovia until his death on 15 May 1560.

== External links and additional sources ==
- Cheney, David M. "Archdiocese of Cartagena". Catholic-Hierarchy.org. (for Chronology of Bishops) ^{[self-published]}
- Chow, Gabriel. "Metropolitan Archdiocese of Cartagena". GCatholic.org. (for Chronology of Bishops) ^{[self-published]}
- Cheney, David M. "Diocese of Mondoñedo–Ferrol". Catholic-Hierarchy.org. (for Chronology of Bishops) ^{[self-published]}
- Chow, Gabriel. "Diocese of Mondoñedo–Ferrol (Spain)". GCatholic.org. (for Chronology of Bishops) ^{[self-published]}
- Cheney, David M. "Diocese of Segovia". Catholic-Hierarchy.org. (for Chronology of Bishops) ^{[self-published]}
- Chow, Gabriel. "Diocese of Segovia (Spain)". GCatholic.org. (for Chronology of Bishops) ^{[self-published]}

Catholic Church titles
Preceded by Jerónimo de Loaysa	Bishop of Cartagena; 1541–1550	Succeeded by Gregorio de Beteta
Preceded by Diego Soto Valer	Bishop of Mondoñedo; 1550–1558	Succeeded by Pedro Maldonado (bishop)
Preceded by Gaspar Zúñiga Avellaneda	Bishop of Segovia; 1558–1560	Succeeded by Martín Pérez de Ayala
