= Pedro Vega (bishop) =

Spanish bishop

Most Reverend Pedro Vega
- Bishop of Cartagena
- Church: Catholic Church
- In office: 1615–1616
- Predecessor: Juan de Labrada
- Successor: Diego Torres Altamirano

Orders
- Consecration: 1615

Personal details
- Born: 3 November 1560 Bubierca, Spain
- Died: 17 June 1616 (aged 55) Cartagena, Colombia

Pedro Vega (1560–1616) was a Roman Catholic prelate who served as Bishop of Cartagena (1615–1616).

== Biography ==
Pedro Vega was born in Bubierca, Spain on 3 Nov 1560. On 6 Oct 1614, he was appointed during the papacy of Pope Paul V as Bishop of Cartagena. In 1615, he was consecrated bishop. He served as Bishop of Cartagena until his death on 17 Jun 1616.

== External links and additional sources ==
- Cheney, David M. "Archdiocese of Cartagena". Catholic-Hierarchy.org. (for Chronology of Bishops) ^{[self-published]}
- Chow, Gabriel. "Metropolitan Archdiocese of Cartagena". GCatholic.org. (for Chronology of Bishops) ^{[self-published]}

Catholic Church titles
Preceded by Juan de Labrada	Bishop of Cartagena; 1615–1616	Succeeded by Diego Torres Altamirano
