= Cristóbal Pérez Lazarraga y Maneli Viana =

17th century clergyman in Latin America

Most Reverend Cristóbal Pérez Lazarraga y Maneli Viana
- Bishop of Cartagena
- Church: Catholic Church
- Diocese: Diocese of Cartagena in Colombia
- In office: 1640–1649
- Predecessor: Luis Córdoba Ronquillo
- Successor: Francisco Rodríguez de Valcárcel
- Previous post: Bishop of Chiapas (1639–1640)

Orders
- Consecration: 2 January 1640 by Agustín Spínola Basadone

Personal details
- Born: 1599 Madrid, Spain
- Died: 18 February 1649 (age 50) Cartagena, Colombia

Cristóbal Pérez Lazarraga y Maneli Viana, O. Cist. (1599 – 18 February 1649) was a Roman Catholic prelate who served as Bishop of Cartagena in Colombia (1640–1649) and Bishop of Chiapas (1639–1640).

== Biography ==
Cristóbal Pérez Lazarraga y Maneli Viana was born in Madrid, Spain in 1599 and ordained a priest in the Cistercian Order. On 3 October 1639, he was appointed during the papacy of Pope Urban VIII as Bishop of Chiapas. On 2 January 1640, he was consecrated bishop by Agustín Spínola Basadone, Archbishop of Santiago de Compostela. On 8 October 1640, he was appointed during the papacy of Pope Urban VIII as Bishop of Cartagena in Colombia. He served as Bishop of Cartagena until his death on 18 February 1649.

While bishop, he was the principal co-consecrator of Francisco Diego Díaz de Quintanilla y de Hevía y Valdés, Bishop of Durango (1640).

== External links and additional sources ==
- Cheney, David M. "Diocese of San Cristóbal de Las Casas". Catholic-Hierarchy.org. (for Chronology of Bishops) ^{[self-published]}
- Chow, Gabriel. "Diocese of San Cristóbal de Las Casas". GCatholic.org. (for Chronology of Bishops) ^{[self-published]}
- Cheney, David M. "Archdiocese of Cartagena". Catholic-Hierarchy.org. (for Chronology of Bishops) ^{[self-published]}
- Chow, Gabriel. "Metropolitan Archdiocese of Cartagena". GCatholic.org. (for Chronology of Bishops) ^{[self-published]}

Catholic Church titles
Preceded by Marcos Ramírez de Prado y Ovando	Bishop of Chiapas; 1639–1640	Succeeded by Domingo Ramírez de Arellano
Preceded by Luis Córdoba Ronquillo	Bishop of Cartagena in Colombia; 1640–1649	Succeeded by Francisco Rodríguez de Valcárcel
