= Pedro de Ágreda Sánchez Martín =

Spanish Roman Catholic prelate

Most Reverend Pedro de Ágreda Sánchez Martín
- Bishop of Coro
- Church: Catholic Church
- In office: 1561–1580
- Predecessor: Juan de Simancas Simancas
- Successor: Juan Manual Martínez de Manzanillo

Orders
- Consecration: 10 June 1565 by Juan de los Barrios

Personal details
- Born: Agreda, Spain
- Died: 1580 Coro, Venezuela

Pedro de Ágreda Sánchez Martín, O.P. (also known simply as Pedro Sánchez Martín or Pedro de Ágreda) (died 1580) was a Roman Catholic prelate who served as Bishop of Coro (1561–1580).

== Biography ==
Pedro de Ágreda Sánchez Martín was born in Agreda, Spain, and ordained a priest in the Order of Preachers. On 27 June 1561, he was appointed during the papacy of Pope Pius IV as Bishop of Coro. On 10 June 1565, he was consecrated bishop by Juan de los Barrios, Archbishop of Santafé en Nueva Granada, with Juan de Simancas Simancas, Bishop of Cartagena, serving as co-consecrator. He served as Bishop of Coro until his death in 1580.

== External links and additional sources ==
- Cheney, David M. "Archdiocese of Caracas, Santiago de Venezuela". Catholic-Hierarchy.org. (for Chronology of Bishops) ^{[self-published]}
- Chow, Gabriel. "Metropolitan Archdiocese of Coro". GCatholic.org. (for Chronology of Bishops) ^{[self-published]}

Catholic Church titles
Preceded by Juan de Simancas Simancas	Bishop of Coro; 1561–1580	Succeeded by Juan Manual Martínez de Manzanillo
