= Diego Guevara =

Roman Catholic prelate

Most Reverend Diego Guevara
- Bishop of Nueva Caceres
- Church: Catholic Church
- In office: 1616–1621
- Predecessor: Pedro Matías
- Successor: Luis de Cañizares

Orders
- Consecration: 1616 by Pedro Castro Quiñones

Personal details
- Born: 1568 Baeza, Spain
- Died: 1621 (aged 52–53) Nueva Caceres

Diego Guevara (1568–1621) was a Roman Catholic prelate who served as Bishop of Nueva Caceres (1616–1621).

== Biography ==
Diego Guevar was born in Baeza, Spain in 1568 and ordained a priest in the Order of Saint Augustine. On 3 August 1616, he was appointed during the papacy of Pope Paul V as Bishop of Nueva Caceres. In 1616, he was consecrated bishop by Pedro Castro Quiñones, Archbishop of Seville. He served as Bishop of Nueva Caceres until his death in 1621.

Catholic Church titles
Preceded by Pedro Matías	Bishop of Nueva Caceres; 1616–1621	Succeeded by Luis de Cañizares
