= Domingo de Oña =

Roman Catholic prelate

Most Reverend Domingo de Oña
- Bishop of Gaeta
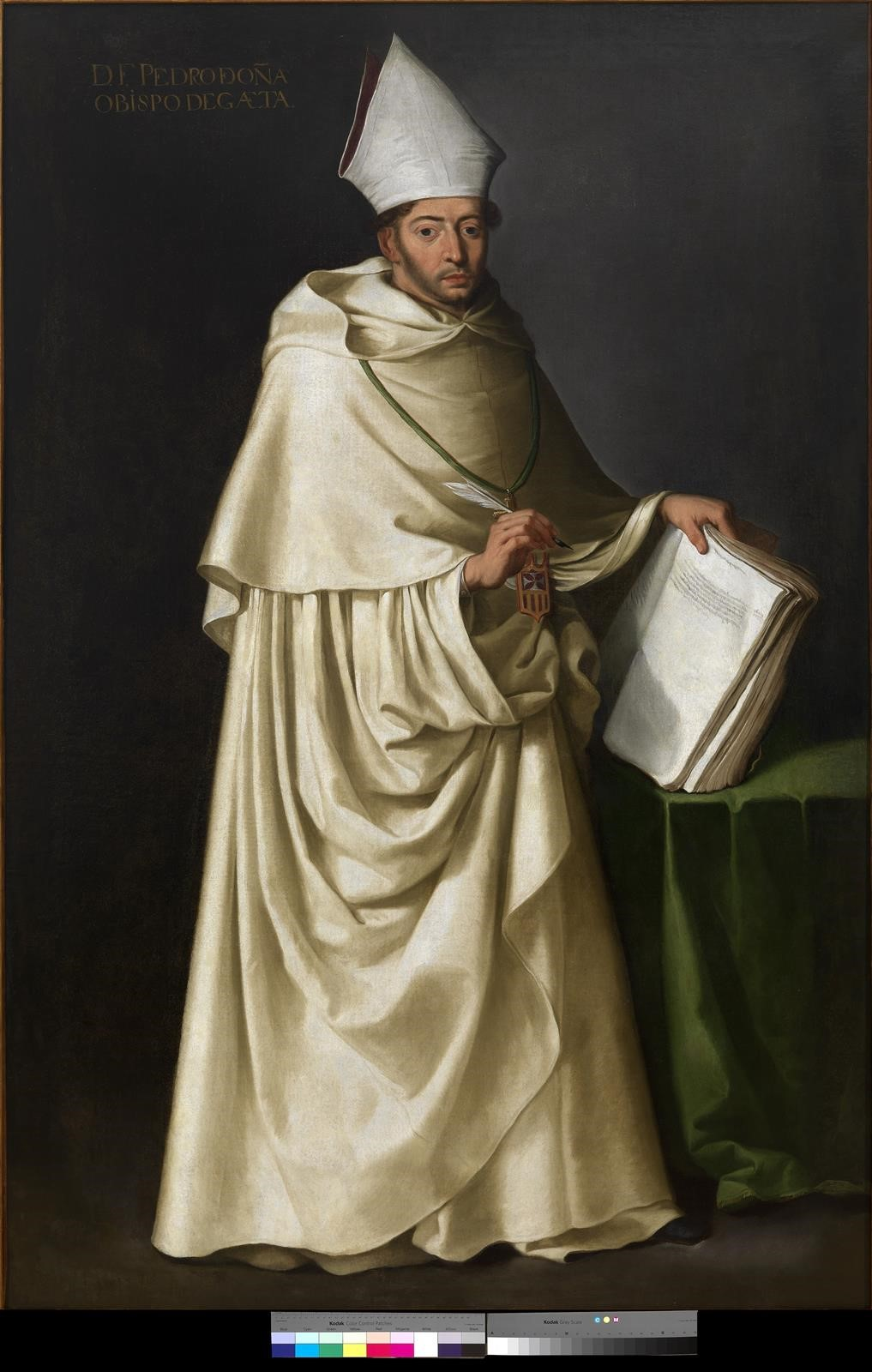
- Church: Catholic Church
- Diocese: Diocese of Gaeta
- In office: 1605–1626
- Predecessor: Giovanni de Gantes
- Successor: Jacinto del Cerro

Orders
- Consecration: 9 December 1601 by Domenico Ginnasi

Personal details
- Born: 1560 Burgos, Spain
- Died: 13 October 1626 (age 66) Gaeta, Italy

Domingo de Oña, O. de M. or Pedro de Oña (1560 – 13 October 1626) was a Roman Catholic prelate who served as Bishop of Gaeta (1605–1626) and Bishop of Coro (1601–1605).

== Biography ==
Domingo de Oña was born in Burgos, Spain in 1560 and ordained a priest in the Order of the Blessed Virgin Mary of Mercy. On 27 August 1601, he was appointed during the papacy of Pope Clement VIII as Bishop of Coro. On 9 December 1601, he was consecrated bishop by Domenico Ginnasi, Archbishop of Manfredonia. On 27 June 1605, he was appointed during the papacy of Pope Paul V as Bishop of Gaeta. He served as Bishop of Gaeta until his death on 13 October 1626.

== Episcopal succession ==
While bishop, he was the principal co-consecrator of:

- Luis Fernández de Córdoba, Bishop of Salamanca (1603);
- Giovanni Falces, Archbishop of Brindisi (1605);
- Fernando Acevedo González, Bishop of Osma (1610);
- Nicola Antonio Spinelli, Bishop of Alessano (1612);
- Juan Torres de Osorio, Bishop of Siracusa (1613); and
- Juan Serrano Ortiz, Bishop of Acerno (1613).

== External links and additional sources ==
- Cheney, David M. "Archdiocese of Caracas, Santiago de Venezuela". Catholic-Hierarchy.org. (for Chronology of Bishops) ^{[self-published]}
- Chow, Gabriel. "Metropolitan Archdiocese of Coro". GCatholic.org. (for Chronology of Bishops) ^{[self-published]}
- Cheney, David M. "Archdiocese of Gaeta". Catholic-Hierarchy.org. (for Chronology of Bishops) ^{[self-published]}
- Chow, Gabriel. "Archdiocese of Gaeta (Italy)". GCatholic.org. (for Chronology of Bishops) ^{[self-published]}

Catholic Church titles
Preceded by Domingo de Salinas	Bishop of Coro; 1601–1605	Succeeded by Antonio de Alzega
Preceded by Giovanni de Gantes	Bishop of Gaeta; 1605–1626	Succeeded by Jacinto del Cerro

'
