= Juan Fernández de Rosillo =

Spanish Roman Catholic prelate

Most Reverend Juan Fernández de Rosillo
- Bishop of Michoacán
- Church: Catholic Church
- In office: 1533–1606
- Predecessor: Andrés de Ubilla
- Successor: Baltazar de Cobarrubias y Múñoz
- Previous post: Bishop of Verapaz (1592–1603)

Orders
- Consecration: 1592 by Antonio de Hervias

Personal details
- Born: 1533 Spain
- Died: 29 October 1606 (age 73) Michoacán, Mexico

Juan Fernández de Rosillo or Juan Fernández de Rovillo (1533 – 29 October 1606) was a Roman Catholic prelate who served as Bishop of Michoacán (1603–1606) and Bishop of Verapaz (1592–1603).

== Biography ==
Juan Fernández de Rosillo was born in Spain in 1533. On 12 June 1592, he was appointed during the papacy of Pope Clement VIII as Bishop of Verapaz. In 1592, he was consecrated bishop by Antonio de Hervias, Bishop of Cartagena. On 29 October 1606, he was appointed during the papacy of Pope Paul V as Bishop of Michoacán. He served as Bishop of Michoacán until his death on 29 October 1606.

== External links and additional sources ==
- Cheney, David M. "Diocese of Verapaz". Catholic-Hierarchy.org. (for Chronology of Bishops) ^{[self-published]}
- Chow, Gabriel. "Diocese of Verapaz (Guatemala)". GCatholic.org. (for Chronology of Bishops) ^{[self-published]}
- Cheney, David M. "Archdiocese of Morelia". Catholic-Hierarchy.org. (for Chronology of Bishops) ^{[self-published]}
- Chow, Gabriel. "Metropolitan Archdiocese of Morelia (Mexico)". GCatholic.org. (for Chronology of Bishops) ^{[self-published]}

Catholic Church titles
Preceded by Antonio de Hervias	Bishop of Verapaz; 1592–1603	Succeeded by None
Preceded by Andrés de Ubilla	Bishop of Michoacán; 1603–1606	Succeeded by Baltazar de Cobarrubias y Múñoz
