= Martín Pérez de Ayala =

Roman Catholic prelate (1504–1566)

Most Reverend Martín Pérez de Ayala
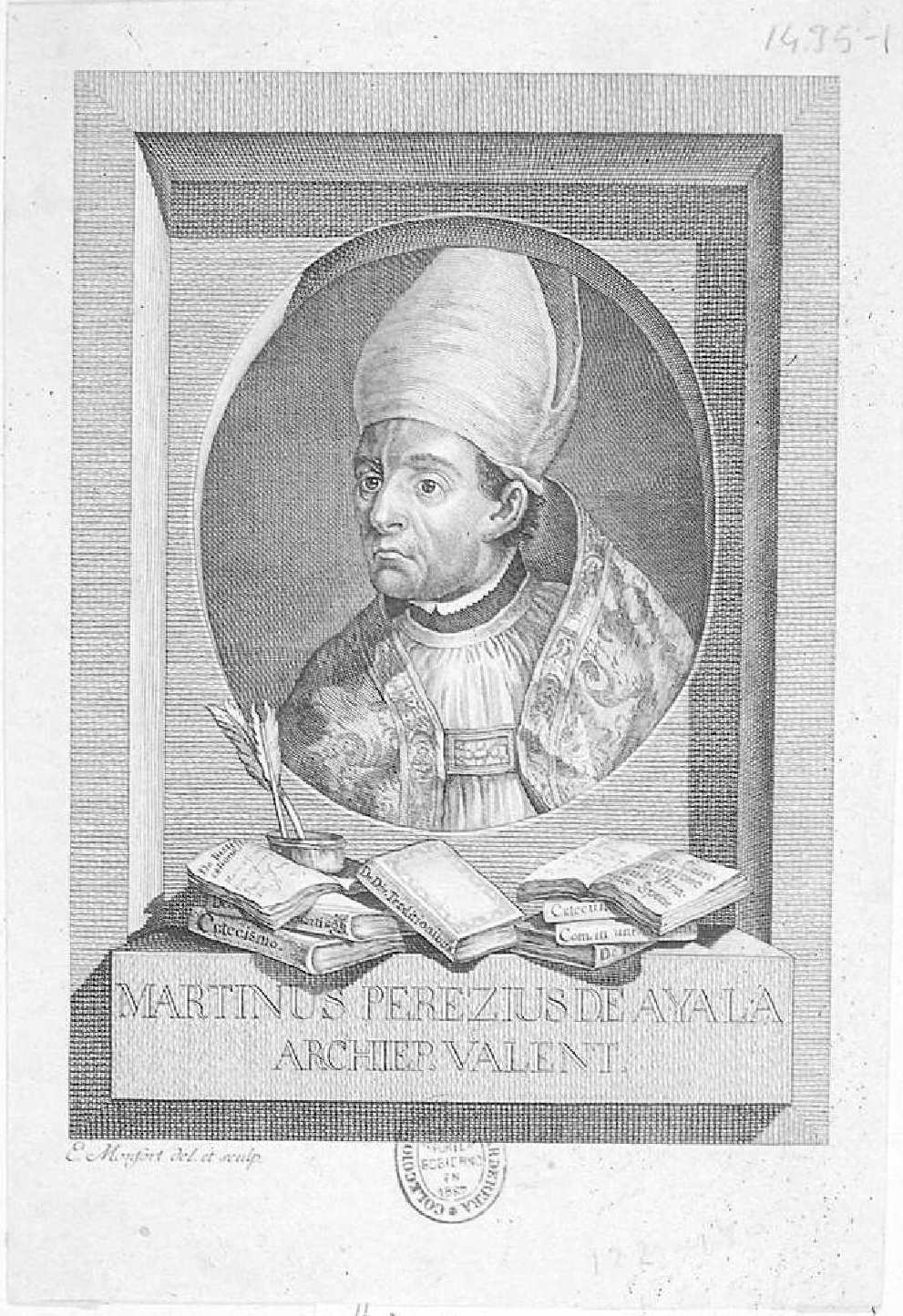
- Church: Catholic Church
- Archdiocese: Archdiocese of Valencia
- In office: 1564–1566
- Predecessor: Acisclo de Moya y Contreras
- Successor: Fernando de Loaces
- Previous posts: Bishop of Guadix (1548–1560); Bishop of Segovia (1560–1564)

Orders
- Consecration: 30 September 1548 by Giovanni Angelo Arcimboldi

Personal details
- Born: 11 November 1504 Segura de la Sierra, Spain
- Died: 5 August 1566 (age 61) Valencia, Spain

Martín Pérez de Ayala (11 November 1504 – 5 August 1566) was a Roman Catholic prelate who served as Archbishop of Valencia (1564–1566), Bishop of Segovia (1560–1564), and Bishop of Guadix (1548–1560).

== Biography ==
Martín Pérez de Ayala was born in Segura de la Sierra, Spain on 11 November 1504. On 16 May 1548, he was appointed during the papacy of Pope Paul III as Bishop of Guadix. On 30 September 1548, he was consecrated bishop by Giovanni Angelo Arcimboldi, Bishop of Novara, with Giovanni Simonetta, Bishop of Lodi, and Francisco de Urríes, Bishop of Urgell, serving as co-consecrators. On 30 May 1549, he was installed as Bishop of Guadix. On 17 July 1560, he was appointed during the papacy of Pope Pius IV as Bishop of Segovia and installed on 12 July 1561. On 6 September 1564, he was appointed during the papacy of Pope Pius IV as Archbishop of Valencia and installed on 23 Apr 1565. He served as Archbishop of Valencia until his death on 5 August 1566.

While bishop, he was the principal co-consecrator of Diego de Covarrubias y Leiva, Archbishop of Santo Domingo (1560).

== Works ==
Some of his works with the year of publication include:

- Notices to die well. Milan, 1552.
- Brief compendium for properly examining conscience in the judgment of sacramental confession. Now again corrected and added. Valence: John May, 1582; other ed. Pamplona, 1612; Valencia: John May, 1567 and Valladolid,
- Christian doctrine in the Arabic-Spanish language composed and printed by order of the Most Illustrious and Reverend Mr. D. Martin Perez de Ayala, Archbishop of Valencia, for the instruction of the new converts of the Kingdom. Valence: John May, 1556; published afterwards under the title Catechism for the instruction of newly converted Moors. Valencia: Peter Patrick May,
- Compendium declaration of what the knights of the Order of James... Milan, 1552, are obliged to keep.
- The Concilium Valentiae Celebratum Anno MDLXV. Valencia: Peter Patrick May,
- Of Divine, Apostolic, and Ecclesiasticis traditionibus, which authorizes ac viearum sacrosancta assertions, his book decems. Cologne: Heirs of John Quentel, 1560; other editions: Colonies: Gasparem Genneperum, 1549; Paris: S. Julian, 1562; Valence: Benedict Monfort, 1726; Venice, 1551.
- Dilucidarum quaestionum super quinque universalia Porphyrii iuxta three ways in scholarly receptivity with explanatory text. Granada, 1537.
- Discourse of the life of the Most Illustrious and Reverend Mr. D. Martin Perez de Ayala... Buenos Aires-Mexico: Espasa-Calpe, 1947; other editions, in: Manuel Serrano y Sanz, Autobiographies and Memoirs of Spaniards of the Sixteenth and Seventeenth Centuries. Madrid: Bailly-Bailiere, 1905, p. 211-2
- Christian doctrine for those who understand already something more than what Indians are usually taught by way of dialogue. Milan, 1554.
- The instructed Christian catechumen. Milan, 1552.
- Life and deeds of Friar Peter Alfonso, knight of James and Prior of Uclés and St. Mark of Leon. Ms.

== External links and additional sources ==
- Cheney, David M. "Diocese of Guadix". Catholic-Hierarchy.org. (for Chronology of Bishops) ^{[self-published]}
- Chow, Gabriel. "Diocese of Guadix". GCatholic.org. (for Chronology of Bishops) ^{[self-published]}
- Cheney, David M. "Diocese of Segovia". Catholic-Hierarchy.org. (for Chronology of Bishops) ^{[self-published]}
- Chow, Gabriel. "Diocese of Segovia (Spain)". GCatholic.org. (for Chronology of Bishops) ^{[self-published]}
- Cheney, David M. "Archdiocese of Valencia". Catholic-Hierarchy.org. (for Chronology of Bishops) ^{[self-published]}
- Chow, Gabriel. "Metropolitan Archdiocese of Valencia". GCatholic.org. (for Chronology of Bishops) ^{[self-published]}

Catholic Church titles
Preceded by Antonio del Aguila Vela y Paz	Bishop of Guadix; 1548–1560	Succeeded by Melchor Alvarez de Vozmediano
Preceded by Francisco de Santa María Benavides Velasco	Bishop of Segovia; 1560–1564	Succeeded by Diego de Covarrubias y Leiva
Preceded by Acisclo de Moya y Contreras	Archbishop of Valencia; 1564–1566	Succeeded by Fernando de Loaces
