= Luis Maldonado (bishop) =

Roman Catholic bishop (??–1596)

Most Reverend Luis Maldonado
- Bishop Elect of Nueva Caceres
- Church: Catholic Church
- Diocese: Diocese of Nueva Caceres
- In office: 1595–1596
- Predecessor: None
- Successor: Francisco Ortega (bishop)

Personal details
- Died: 1596

Luis Maldonado (died 1596) was a Roman Catholic prelate who was appointed as the first Bishop of Nueva Caceres (1595–1596).

== Biography ==
Luis Maldonado was ordained a priest in the Order of Friars Minor. On 30 August 1595, he was appointed during the papacy of Pope Clement VIII as the first Bishop of Nueva Caceres. He died before he was consecrated in 1596.

== External links and additional sources ==
- Cheney, David M. "Archdiocese of Caceres (Nueva Caceres)". Catholic-Hierarchy.org. (for Chronology of Bishops) ^{[self-published]}
- Chow, Gabriel. "Metropolitan Archdiocese of Caceres". GCatholic.org. (for Chronology of Bishops) ^{[self-published]}

Catholic Church titles
Preceded by None	Bishop Elect of Nueva Caceres; 1595–1596	Succeeded by Francisco Ortega (bishop)
