= Pedro Angulo =

Spanish Dominican missionary in Guatemala

Most Reverend Pedro Angulo
- Bishop-Elect of Verapaz
- Church: Catholic Church
- Diocese: Diocese of Verapaz
- In office: 1561–1562
- Predecessor: None
- Successor: Pedro de la Peña

Personal details
- Born: Miranda de Ebro
- Died: 1 April 1562 Zalama

Pedro Angulo, O.P. (died 1561) was a Spanish Dominican missionary in Guatemala, in the sixteenth century.

== Biography ==
He was a native of Burgos, Spain and came to America in 1524 as a soldier. He later joined the Dominican order in 1529. He became a companion of Bartolomé de las Casas in Guatemala, Central America in general, and the Greater Antilles (Santo Domingo). He was made Provincial of the Dominicans for Chiapas and Bishop of Vera Paz, but died soon afterwards. Angulo was one of the principal figures of the earliest Indian Missions in Southern Mexico and Guatemala, and more successful than Las Casas. He visited tribe after tribe, and lived and taught among them. He resorted to charts on which biblical subjects were allegorically represented. These he carried with him through the wilderness to use as illustrations for his discourses to the natives.

He was proficient in Nahuatl and Zutuhil, and wrote several tracts on religious subjects in the latter.

== External links and additional sources ==
- Cheney, David M. "Diocese of Verapaz". Catholic-Hierarchy.org. (for Chronology of Bishops) ^{[self-published]}
- Chow, Gabriel. "Diocese of Verapaz (Guatemala)". GCatholic.org. (for Chronology of Bishops) ^{[self-published]}

Attribution

The entry cites:

- documents concerning Las Casas, in the Documentos inéditos de Indias
- the writings of Las Casas himself
- Antonio de Remesal, Historia de la provincia de Guatemala y San Vicente de Chyapas (Madrid, 1619)
- Charles Étienne Brasseur de Bourbourg, Bibliothèque méxico-guatémalienne (Paris. 1871)
- Ephraim George Squier, Monograph of Authors who have Written on the Languages of Central America (New York, 1861)
