= García Díaz Arias =

Roman Catholic prelate

Most Reverend García Díaz Arias
- Bishop of Quito
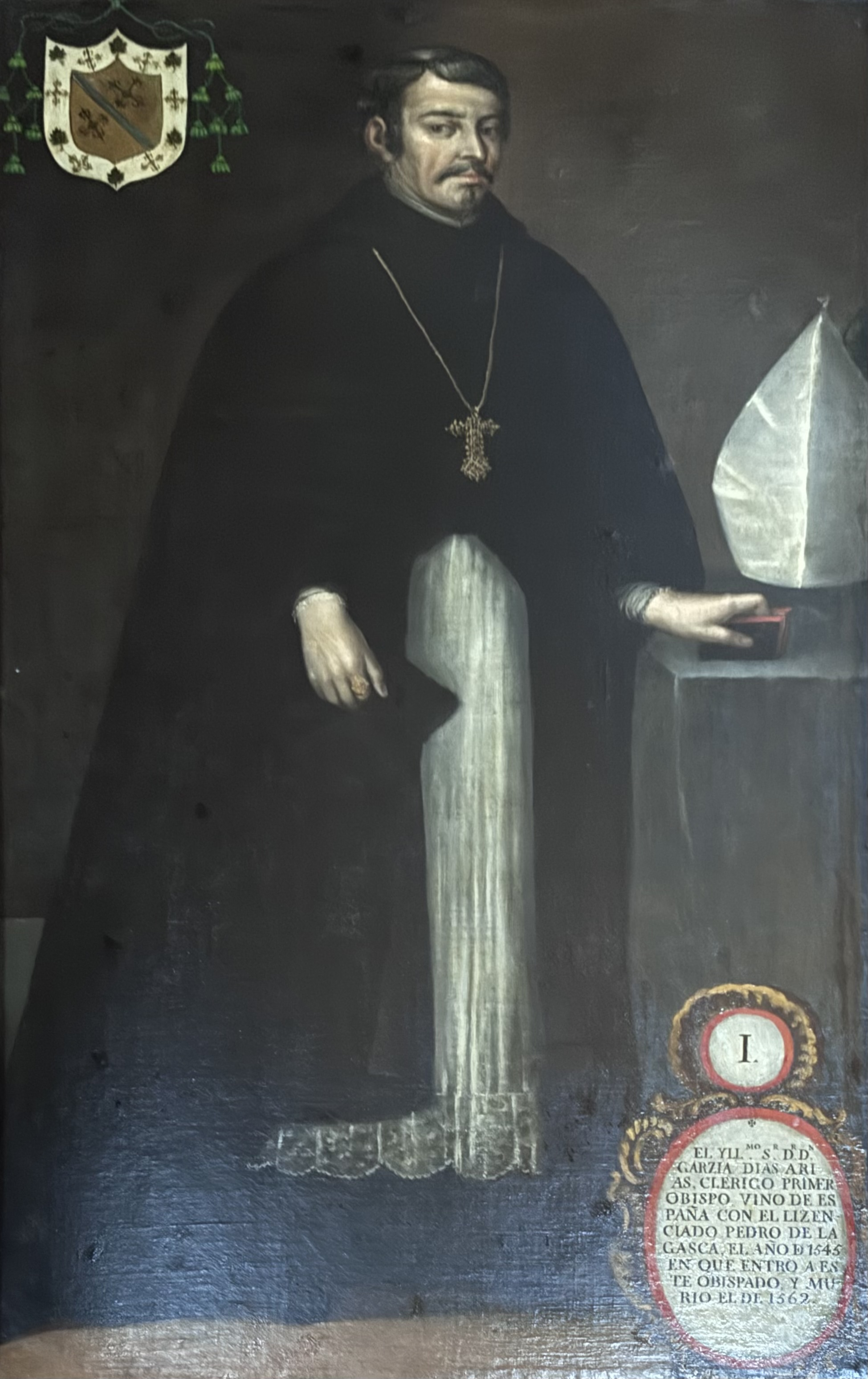
- Church: Catholic Church
- Diocese: Diocese of Quito
- In office: 1546–1562
- Predecessor: None
- Successor: Pedro de la Peña

Orders
- Consecration: 5 June 1547 by Juan Solano

Personal details
- Died: 1562 Quito, Ecuador

García Díaz Arias (died 1562) was a Roman Catholic prelate who served as the first Bishop of Quito (1546–1562).

== Biography ==
On 8 January 1546, García Díaz Arias was appointed during the papacy of Pope Paul III as Bishop of Quito. On 5 June 1547, he was consecrated bishop by Juan Solano, Bishop of Cuzco. He served as Bishop of Quito until his death in 1562.

While bishop, he was the principal co-consecrator of Martín de Calatayud, Bishop of Santa Marta (1547).

== External links and additional sources ==
- Chow, Gabriel. "Metropolitan Archdiocese of Concepción (Chile)". GCatholic.org. (for Chronology of Bishops) ^{[self-published]}
- Cheney, David M. "Archdiocese of Quito". Catholic-Hierarchy.org. (for Chronology of Bishops) ^{[self-published]}

Catholic Church titles
Preceded by None	Bishop of Quito; 1546–1562	Succeeded by Pedro de la Peña
