= Jerónimo de Loayza =

16th-century Spanish Catholic bishop and friar

The Most Rev. Lord Brother Jerónimo de Loayza y González, O.P.
- Archbishop of Lima
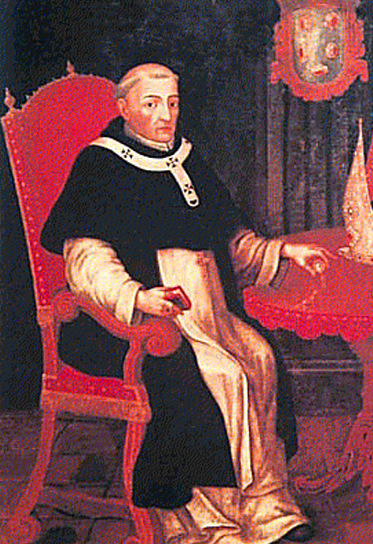
- Jerónimo de Loayza, wearing the pallium over the choir dress of a Dominican bishop
- Province: Seville (1544–1546)
- See: Lima
- Appointed: 13 May 1541 (diocese); 12 February 1546 (archdiocese)
- Term ended: 14 January 1575
- Predecessor: None
- Successor: Diego Gómez de Lamadrid, O.Ss.T.
- Other posts: Bishop of Lima (1541–1546); Bishop of Cartagena (1537–1541)

Orders
- Ordination: ca. 1532
- Consecration: 29 June 1538 by Luis Cabeza de Vaca

Personal details
- Born: 1498 Trujillo, Cáceres, Crown of Castile
- Died: 14 January 1575 (aged 76–77) Lima, Viceroyalty of Peru, Spanish Empire
- Buried: Lima, Peru

Jerónimo de Loayza y González, O.P. (1498 – October 25, 1575), was a Spanish Dominican friar and missionary, who was selected as the first Archbishop of Lima. He established the first hospital, initiated construction of the early cathedrals, and also established schools to educate the sons of both the Spanish rulers and Inca elite families. He supported the founding of the University of San Marcos in Lima.

== Life ==
Loayza was born in Trujillo in the Province of Cáceres. He entered the Dominican Order as a teenager, and after his religious profession, pursued his studies at Valladolid and at the Monastery of San Pablo in Córdoba.

His superiors sent Loayza to the missions of New Spain in 1529, where he worked in Cartagena serving both the Spanish colonists and the Native Americans of the city. In recognition of the reputation he had gained in this, he was appointed the first Bishop of Cartagena on December 5, 1537, by Emperor Charles V, which was approved by Pope Paul III. He returned to Spain where he was consecrated for this office on 29 June 29, 1538 by Luis Cabeza de Vaca, at that time the Bishop of Salamanca.

At that time, the only resident bishop in South America was the Bishop of Cuzco in Peru, based in the former capital of the Inca Empire. With the growing influence under the Spanish Empire of the city of Las Reyes, as the city was then called, Pope Paul III established a new diocese with its seat there on May 13, 1541. Loayza was appointed the first Bishop of Lima, with the diocese soon being raised to the status of an archdiocese on 12 February 12, 1546.

As the head of an ecclesiastical province, Loayza was vigorous in his efforts at establishing the mission of the Catholic Church in the New World, continuing to show the spirit of concern for the welfare of the indigenous population he had demonstrated in Cartagena. In line with this, he requested that the pope issue a decree recognizing the humanity of the native peoples of the Americas and clarifying their proper treatment by the Spanish Empire. He also established the Hospital de Santa Ana de los Naturales, predecessor of the current Hospital Nacional Arzobispo Loayza. The bishop established his residence at the hospital in order to supervise the treatment of its patients, and instructed the staff to provide the patients being discharged with food and money so that they could return securely to their home towns.

In 1551, Loayza held the first Provincial Council of bishops of the region. In that same year he had construction begun of the Cathedral of Lima. Another Council was held in 1567 which issued significant documents, not just in Church matters, but analyzing the unjust treatment of the native population.

To further education, Loayza founded schools at which the sons of the colonial elite studied together the sons of the native chiefs. He further supported the establishment of the University of San Marcos, the oldest university in the Americas, by members of his Order, under the leadership of Fray Thomas de San Martin, O.P.

Loayza was, notably, the consecrator of Domingo de Santo Tomás, Bishop of La Plata o Charcas; Antonio Avendaño y Paz, Bishop of Concepción; Martín de Calatayud, Bishop of Santa Marta; and Juan Solano, the second Bishop of Cuzco.

Loayza died on 25 October 1575. His remains were initially buried, as per his wishes, on the grounds of the hospital he had founded and loved. In the 18th century, however, they were exhumed and entombed in the crypt of the Cathedral Basilica of Lima.

== External links and additional sources ==
- Cheney, David M. "Archdiocese of Cartagena". Catholic-Hierarchy.org. (for Chronology of Bishops) ^{[self-published]}
- Chow, Gabriel. "Metropolitan Archdiocese of Cartagena". GCatholic.org. (for Chronology of Bishops) ^{[self-published]}
- Cheney, David M. "Archdiocese of Lima". Catholic-Hierarchy.org. (for Chronology of Bishops) ^{[self-published]}
- Chow, Gabriel. "Metropolitan Archdiocese of Lima (Peru)". GCatholic.org. (for Chronology of Bishops) ^{[self-published]}

Religious titles
Preceded by Tomás de Toro	Bishop of Cartagena; 1537–1541	Succeeded by Francisco de Santa María Benavides Velasco
Preceded by None	Bishop of Lima / Archbishop of Lima; 1541	Succeeded by Diego Gómez de Lamadrid
