= Juan Bartolomé de Bohorquez e Hinojosa =

Mexican prelate (1542–1633)

Most Reverend Juan Bartolomé de Bohorquez e Hinojosa
- Bishop of Antequera
- Church: Catholic Church
- Diocese: Diocese of Antequera, Oaxaca
- In office: 1617–1633
- Predecessor: Juan de Cervantes
- Successor: Leonel de Cervantes y Caravajal
- Previous post: Bishop of Coro (1611–1617)

Personal details
- Born: 24 August 1542 México
- Died: September 1633 (age 91) Antequera, México

Juan Bartolome de Bohórquez e Hinojosa, OP (24 August 1542 – September, 1633) was a Roman Catholic prelate who served as Bishop of Antequera (1617–1633) and Bishop of Coro (1611–1617).

== Biography ==
Juan Bartolome de Bohórquez e Hinojosa was born in México on 24 August 1542 and ordained a priest in the Order of Preachers. On 17 July 1611, he was appointed during the papacy of Pope Paul V as Bishop of Coro. On 13 November 1617, he was appointed during the papacy of Pope Paul V as Bishop of Antequera. He served as Bishop of Antequera until his death in September 1633.

While bishop, he was the principal consecrator of Francisco de la Cámara y Raya, Bishop of Panamá (1614); Gonzalo de Angulo, Bishop of Coro (1618); and Bernardino de Salazar y Frías, Bishop of Chiapas (1623).

== External links and additional sources ==
- Cheney, David M. "Archdiocese of Antequera, Oaxaca". Catholic-Hierarchy.org. (for Chronology of Bishops) ^{[self-published]}
- Chow, Gabriel. "Metropolitan Archdiocese of Antequera". GCatholic.org. (for Chronology of Bishops) ^{[self-published]}
- Cheney, David M. "Archdiocese of Caracas, Santiago de Venezuela". Catholic-Hierarchy.org. (for Chronology of Bishops) ^{[self-published]}
- Chow, Gabriel. "Metropolitan Archdiocese of Coro". GCatholic.org. (for Chronology of Bishops) ^{[self-published]}

Catholic Church titles
Preceded by Antonio de Alzega	Bishop of Coro; 1611–1617	Succeeded by Gonzalo de Angulo
Preceded by Juan de Cervantes (bishop)	Bishop of Antequera; 1617–1633	Succeeded by Leonel de Cervantes y Caravajal
