= Pedro de Godinez =

Most Reverend Pedro de Godinez
- Bishop Elect of Nueva Caceres
- Church: Catholic Church
- Diocese: Diocese of Nueva Caceres
- In office: 1605–1611
- Predecessor: Baltazar de Cobarrubias y Múñoz
- Successor: Pedro Matías

Personal details
- Died: 1611

Pedro de Godinez (died 1611) was a Roman Catholic prelate who was appointed as Bishop of Nueva Caceres (1605–1611).

== Biography ==
De Godinez was ordained a priest in the Order of Friars Minor. On 12 December 1605, he was appointed during the papacy of Pope Paul V as Bishop of Nueva Caceres. He died before he was consecrated in 1611.

== External links and additional sources ==
- Cheney, David M. "Archdiocese of Caceres (Nueva Caceres)". Catholic-Hierarchy.org. (for Chronology of Bishops) ^{[self-published]}
- Chow, Gabriel. "Metropolitan Archdiocese of Caceres". GCatholic.org. (for Chronology of Bishops) ^{[self-published]}

Catholic Church titles
Preceded by Baltazar de Cobarrubias y Múñoz	Bishop Elect of Nueva Caceres; 1605–1611	Succeeded by Pedro Matías
