= Antonio de Alzega =

Most Reverend Antonio de Alzega
- Bishop of Coro
- Church: Catholic Church
- Diocese: Diocese of Coro
- In office: 1604–1610
- Predecessor: Domingo de Oña
- Successor: Juan Bartolome de Bohórquez e Hinojosa

Orders
- Consecration: 1606

Personal details
- Born: 1555 Azpeitia, Spain
- Died: 13 May 1610 (age 55) Coro, Venezuela

Antonio de Alzega, O.F.M or Antonio de Alcega (1555 – 13 May 1610) was a Roman Catholic prelate who served as Bishop of Coro (1604–1610).

== Biography ==
Antonio de Alzega was born in Azpeitia, Spain in 1555 and ordained a priest in the Order of Friars Minor. On 25 September 1604, he was selected by the King of Spain as Bishop of Coro and confirmed by Pope Clement VIII on 12 December 1605. In 1606, he was consecrated bishop. He served as Bishop of Coro until his death on 13 May 1610.

== External links and additional sources ==
- Cheney, David M. "Archdiocese of Caracas, Santiago de Venezuela". Catholic-Hierarchy.org. (for Chronology of Bishops) ^{[self-published]}
- Chow, Gabriel. "Metropolitan Archdiocese of Coro". GCatholic.org. (for Chronology of Bishops) ^{[self-published]}

Catholic Church titles
Preceded by Domingo de Oña	Bishop of Coro; 1604–1610	Succeeded by Juan Bartolome de Bohórquez e Hinojosa
