= Andrés de Ubilla =

Roman Catholic prelate

Most Reverend Andrés de Ubilla
- Bishop of Michoacán
- Church: Catholic Church
- Diocese: Diocese of Michoacán
- In office: 1603
- Predecessor: Domingo de Ulloa
- Successor: Juan Fernández de Rosillo
- Previous post: Bishop of Chiapas (1592–1603)

Orders
- Ordination: 22 July 1558

Personal details
- Born: 1540 Eibar, Spain
- Died: May 1603 (age 63) Michoacán, Mexico

Andrés de Ubilla, O.P. (1540 – May 1603) was a Roman Catholic prelate who served as Bishop of Michoacán (1603) and Bishop of Chiapas (1592–1603).

== Biography ==
Andrés de Ubilla was born in Eibar, Spain in 1540 and ordained as a priest in the Order of Preachers on 22 July 1558. In 1587 Andrés was accused of inappropriate behavior by Diego Durán. On 21 May 1592, he was appointed during the papacy of Pope Clement VIII as Bishop of Chiapas. On 29 January 1603, he was appointed during the papacy of Pope Clement VIII as Bishop of Michoacán. He served as Bishop of Michoacán until his death in May 1603.

== External links and additional sources ==
- Cheney, David M. "Diocese of San Cristóbal de Las Casas". Catholic-Hierarchy.org. (for Chronology of Bishops) ^{[self-published]}
- Chow, Gabriel. "Diocese of San Cristóbal de Las Casas". GCatholic.org. (for Chronology of Bishops) ^{[self-published]}
- Cheney, David M. "Archdiocese of Morelia". Catholic-Hierarchy.org. (for Chronology of Bishops) ^{[self-published]}
- Chow, Gabriel. "Metropolitan Archdiocese of Morelia (Mexico)". GCatholic.org. (for Chronology of Bishops) ^{[self-published]}

Catholic Church titles
Preceded by Pedro Martín Fernández	Bishop of Chiapas; 1592–1603	Succeeded by Lucas Duran
Preceded by Domingo de Ulloa	Bishop of Michoacán; 1603	Succeeded by Juan Fernández de Rosillo
