= Jorge Enrique Jiménez Carvajal =

Colombian Catholic prelate (born 1942)

His Eminence Jorge Enrique Jiménez Carvajal C.I.M.
- Archbishop Emeritus of Cartagena
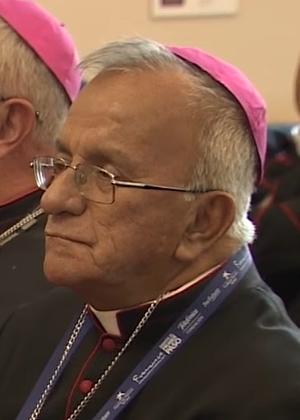
- The then-archbishop on 7 September 2017.
- Church: Roman Catholic Church
- Archdiocese: Cartagena
- See: Cartagena
- Appointed: 24 October 2005
- Installed: 4 November 2005
- Term ended: 25 March 2021
- Predecessor: Carlos José Ruiseco Vieira
- Successor: Francisco Javier Múnera Correa
- Other post: Cardinal-Priest of Santa Dorotea (2022–)
- Previous posts: Bishop of Zipaquirá (1992–2004); General Secretary of the Latin American Episcopal Council (1995–99); President of the Latin American Episcopal Council (1999–2003); Apostolic Administrator of Zipaquirá (2004); Coadjutor Archbishop of Cartagena (2004–05); Apostolic Administrator of Cartagena (2021)

Orders
- Ordination: 17 June 1967 by Héctor Rueda Hernández
- Consecration: 12 December 1992 by Mario Revollo Bravo
- Created cardinal: 27 August 2022 by Pope Francis
- Rank: Cardinal-Priest

Personal details
- Born: Jorge Enrique Jiménez Carvajal; 29 March 1942 (age 84) Bucaramanga, Colombia
- Education: Pontifical Xavierian University
- Motto: Viva Jesus y María (Long Live Jesus and Mary)
- Coat of arms

Jorge Enrique Jiménez Carvajal C.J.M. (born 29 March 1942) is a Colombian prelate of the Catholic Church who was archbishop of Cartagena from 2008 to 2021. He was bishop of Zipaquirá from 1992 to 1994 and archbishop coadjutor of Cartagena from 2004 to 2005.

Pope Francis made Jiménez a cardinal on 27 August 2022.

== Biography ==
Jorge Enrique Jiménez Carvajal was born on 29 March 1942 in Bucaramanga, Colombia. He began his preparation for the priesthood at the minor seminary in Floridablanca. He studied philosophy at the Pontifical Xavierian University in Bogotá and theology at the Major Seminary of the Congregation of Jesus and Mary (Eudists) in Bogotá. On 17 May 1964, he took his solemn vows as a member of the Congregation. He was ordained a priest in Bucaramanga on 17 June 1967 by Bishop Héctor Rueda Hernández.

He obtained a licentiate in philosophy from the Pontifical Xavierian University. He was a professor at the Major Seminary of Santa Rosa de Osos, formator of the Eudist Seminary of Valmaría in Bogotá, head of the charitable section of the Eudist Community of "Elmin de Dios" in Bogotá, director of studies at the Institute Theological-Pastoral of CELAM in Medellín, provincial superior of his Congregation in Colombia and, from 1989 to 1991, secretary of the Latin American Confederation of Religious.

On 9 November 1992, Pope John Paul II appointed him bishop of Zipaquirá. He received his episcopal consecration on 12 December from Cardinal Mario Revollo Bravo.

From 1995 to 1999 he was secretary general of CELAM and from 1999 to 2003 he was its president. Jiménez was named a member of the Pontifical Council for the Pastoral Care of Health Care Workers and on 15 May 2001 of the Pontifical Commission for Latin America.

In 2001, he was named by Pope John Paul to participate in the tenth ordinary assembly of the Synod of Bishops, and again in 2009 for the special synod on Africa. On 13 December 2001, as head of CELAM, he participated in a meeting convened by Pope John Paul to discuss the problem of pastoral care in the Holy Land.

In November 2002, Jiménez along with a priest was kidnapped by anti-government rebels while traveling north of Bogotá. They were rescued after four days by a special unit of the Colombian army.

On 6 February 2004, he was named coadjutor archbishop of Cartagena, where he succeeded as archbishop when Pope Benedict XVI accepted the resignation of Archbishop Carlos José Ruiseco Vieira on 24 October 2005. He was installed in Cartagena on 4 November.

Pope Francis accepted his resignation on 25 March 2021.

On 29 May 2022, Pope Francis announced he would make Jiménez a cardinal. He had a private audience with the pope on 20 August. On 27 August 2022, Pope Francis made him a cardinal priest, assigning him the title of Santa Dorotea.

== See also ==
- Cardinals created by Francis
