= Pedro Arévalos =

Most Reverend Pedro Arévalos
- Bishop of Cartagena
- Church: Catholic Church
- Diocese: Diocese of Cartagena
- In office: 1571–1572
- Predecessor: Juan de Simancas Simancas
- Successor: Dionisio de Santos

Personal details
- Born: Spain
- Died: 1572 Spain

Pedro Arévalos, O.S.H. (died 1572) was a Roman Catholic prelate who served as Bishop of Cartagena (1571–1572).

== Biography ==
Pedro Arévalos was born in Spain and ordained a priest in the Order of Saint Jerome. On 8 May 1571, he was appointed during the papacy of Pope Pius V as Bishop of Cartagena. He served as Bishop of Cartagena until his death in 1572.

Catholic Church titles
Preceded by Juan de Simancas Simancas	Bishop of Cartagena; 1571–1572	Succeeded by Dionisio de Santos
