= Majadas de Tiétar =

Coordinates: 39°56′N 5°44′W

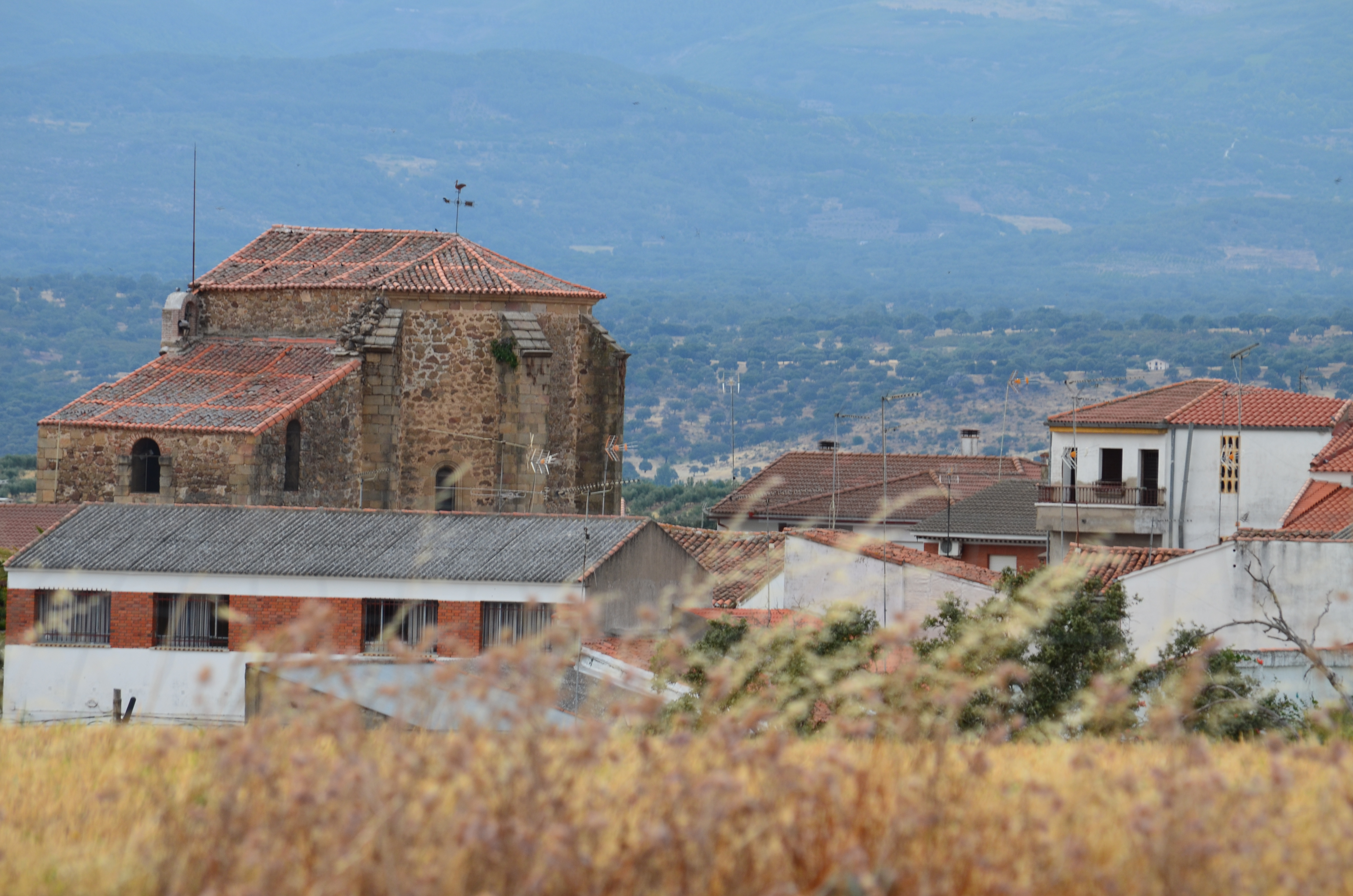
- Church of San Salvador in Majadas de Tiétar

- Flag Coat of arms

- Location in Spain.
- Country: Spain
- Autonomous community: Cáceres

Area
  - Total: 51.96 km^{2} (20.06 sq mi)
- Elevation: 264 m (866 ft)

Population (2025-01-01)
  - Total: 1,281
  - Density: 24.65/km^{2} (63.85/sq mi)
- Time zone: UTC+1 (CET)
  - Summer (DST): UTC+2 (CEST)

Majadas de Tiétar is a municipality in the province of Cáceres and autonomous community of Extremadura, Spain. The municipality covers an area of 52 square kilometres (20 sq mi) and as of 2011 had a population of 1352 people.

== See also ==
- List of municipalities in Cáceres
