= Pedro Maldonado (bishop) =

Spanish Roman Catholic prelate

Most Reverend Pedro Maldonado
- Bishop of Mondoñedo
- Church: Catholic Church
- Diocese: Diocese of Mondoñedo
- In office: 1559–1566
- Predecessor: Francisco de Santa María Benavides Velasco
- Successor: Gonzalo de Solórzano

Personal details
- Born: Spain
- Died: 2 July 1566 Mondoñedo, Spain

Pedro Maldonado, O.F.M. (died 1566) was a Roman Catholic prelate who served as Bishop of Mondoñedo (1559–1566).

== Biography ==
Pedro Maldonado was born in Spain and ordained a priest in the Order of Friars Minor. On 23 Jan 1559, he was appointed during the papacy of Pope Paul IV as Bishop of Mondoñedo. He served as Bishop of Mondoñedo until his death on 2 Jul 1566.

Catholic Church titles
Preceded by Francisco de Santa María Benavides Velasco	Bishop of Mondoñedo; 1559–1566	Succeeded by Gonzalo de Solórzano
