= Ubilla =

- Location within the Dominican Republic
- Coordinates: 18°22′12″N 71°13′12″W
- Country: Dominican Republic
- Province: Baoruco

Population (2008)
  - Total: 2,178

Ubilla is a town in the province of Baoruco in the Dominican Republic.

== Sources ==
- – World-Gazetteer.com
