= Cabanillas del Campo =

- Municipality
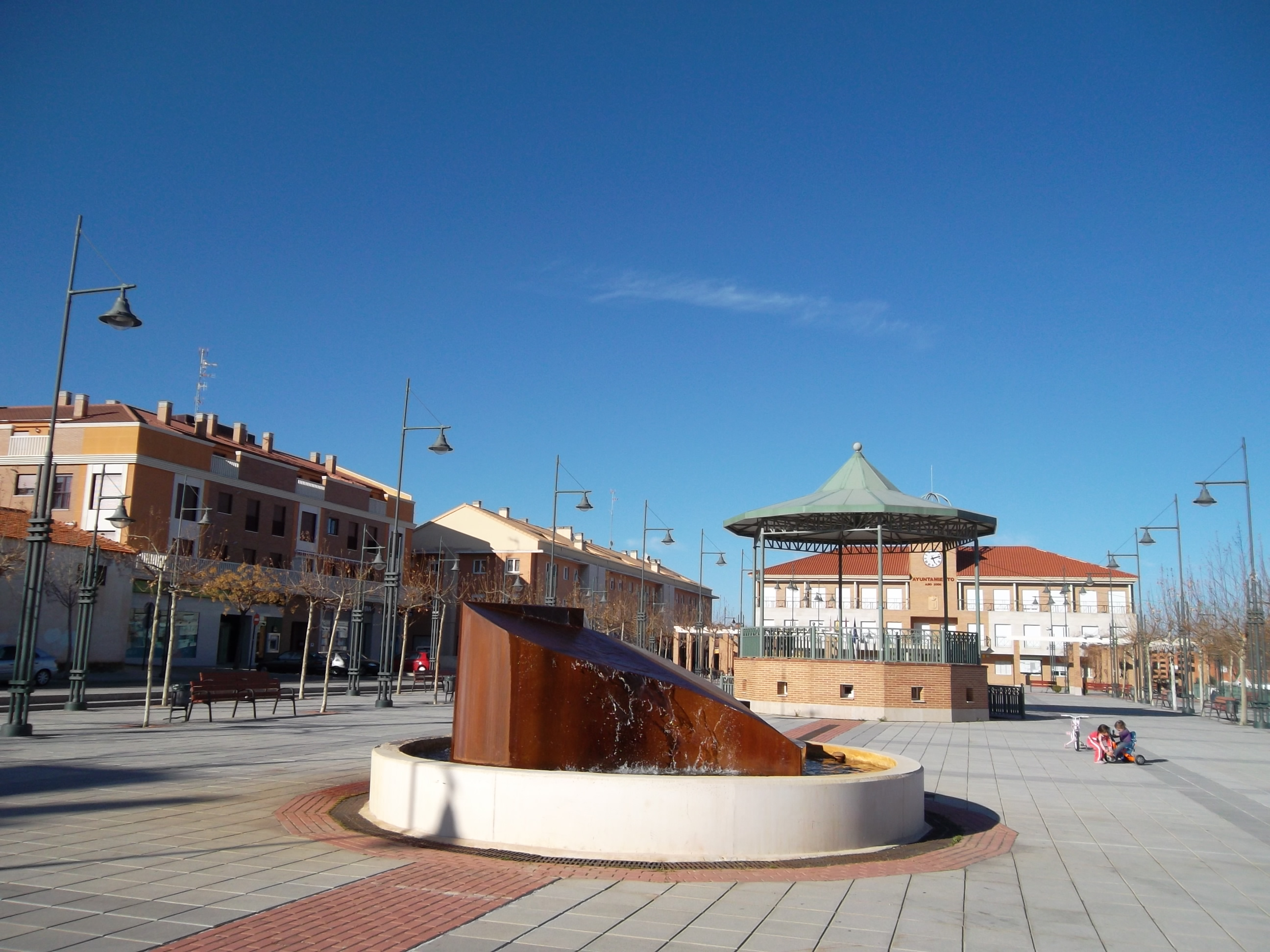

- Flag Coat of arms
- Interactive map of Cabanillas del Campo
- Location within Castilla-La Mancha Location within Spain
- Coordinates: 40.638333°N 3.235278°W
- Country: Spain
- Autonomous community: Castilla–La Mancha
- Province: Guadalajara

Area
  - Total: 34 km^{2} (13 sq mi)
- Elevation: 691 m (2,267 ft)

Population (2025-01-01)
  - Total: 11,572
  - Density: 340/km^{2} (880/sq mi)
- Time zone: UTC+1 (CET)
  - Summer (DST): UTC+2 (CEST)

Cabanillas del Campo is a municipality of Spain located in the province of Guadalajara, Castilla–La Mancha. As of 2017, it has registered population of 9,947. The municipality includes 2 supermarkets, three primary schools, one secondary (high) school and many plazas. The municipality has experienced extensive growth since the 90s, and the 2000s and 2010s saw a surge in young families who find the town's safe, child-friendly environment and amenities ideal.
