= Roman Catholic Archdiocese of Cartagena =

Catholic archdiocese in Colombia

Coordinates: 10.4236°N 75.5509°W

Archdiocese of Cartagena Archidioecesis Carthaginensis

Catholic

Location
- Country: Colombia

Statistics
- Area: 8,000 km^{2} (3,100 sq mi)
- Population: Total; Catholics: (as of 2006); 1,228,000; 1,076,000 (87.6%)

Information
- Rite: Latin Rite
- Established: 24 April 1534 (492 years ago)
- Cathedral: Catedral Basílica Metropolitana de Santa Catalina de Alejandría

Current leadership
- Pope: Leo XIV
- Archbishop: Francisco Javier Múnera Correa, I.M.C.
- Bishops emeritus: Carlos José Ruiseco Vieira; Jorge Enrique Jiménez Carvajal, C.I.M.

Map

Website
- arquicartagena.org

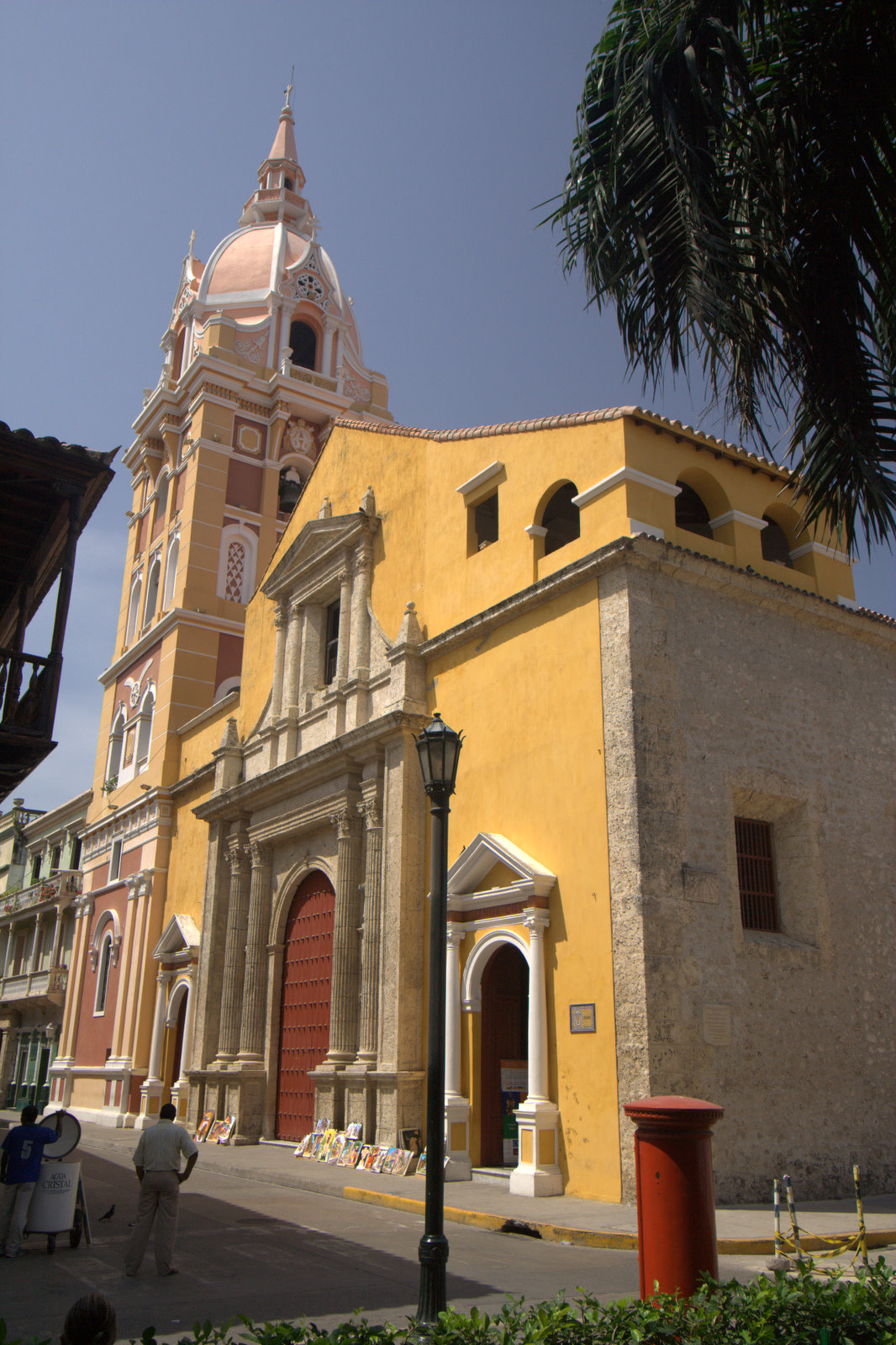
Metropolitan Cathedral Basilica of Saint Catherine of Alexandria

The Roman Catholic Archdiocese of Cartagena (Latin: Carthaginsis) is an archdiocese located in the city of Cartagena in Colombia.

== History ==
- 24 April 1534: Established as Diocese of Cartagena from the Diocese of Panamá
- 20 June 1900: Promoted as Metropolitan Archdiocese of Cartagena

== Bishops ==
=== Ordinaries ===
Diocese of Cartagena

Erected: April 24, 1534

- Tomás de Toro, O.P. (1534–1536 Died)
- Jerónimo de Loayza, O.P. (1537–1541 Appointed, Bishop of Lima)
- Francisco de Santa María Benavides Velasco, O.S.H. (1541–1550 Appointed, Bishop of Mondoñedo)
  - Gregorio de Beteta, O.P. (1552–1556 Resigned before consecration)
- Juan de Simancas Simancas (1561–1570 Resigned without permission in 1569 and died in 1570)
- Pedro Arévalos, O.S.H. (1571–1572 Died)
- Dionisio de Santos, O.P. (1574–1577 Died)
- Juan Montalvo, O.P. (1578–1586 Died)
- Antonio de Hervias, O.P. (1587–1590 Died)
- Juan de Labrada, O.P. (1597–1613 Died)
- Pedro Vega (1614–1616 Died)
- Diego Torres Altamirano, O.F.M. (1617–1621 Died)
- Francisco Sotomayor, O.F.M. (1623–1623 Appointed, Bishop of Quito)
- Diego Ramirez de Cepeda (1624–1629 Died)
- Luis Córdoba Ronquillo, O.SS.T. (1630–1640 Confirmed, Bishop of Trujillo)
- Cristóbal Pérez Lazarraga y Maneli Viana, O. Cist. (1640–1649 Died)
- Francisco Rodríguez de Valcárcel (1649–1651 Died)
- Garcia Ruiz Cabezas (1654–1658 Died)
- Antonio Sanz Lozano (1659–1680 Appointed, Archbishop of Santafé en Nueva Granada)
- Miguel Antonio de Benavides y Piedrola (1681–1713 Died)
- Antonio María Casiani, O.S.Bas. (1714–1717 Died)
- Juan Francisco Gómez Calleja (1720–1725 Appointed, Bishop of Popayán)
- Manuel Antonio Gómez de Silva (1726–1728 Confirmed, Bishop of Popayán)
- Juan Francisco Gómez Calleja (1728–1729 Died)
- Gregorio de Molleda y Clerque (1729–1740 Appointed, Bishop of Trujillo)
- Diego Martínez y Garrido, O.S. (1741–1746 Resigned)
- Bernardo de Arbizu y Ugarte (1746–1751 Confirmed, Bishop of Trujillo)
- Bartolomé de Narváez y Berrio (1751–1754 Died)
- Jacinto Aguado y Chacón (1754–1755 Appointed Bishop of Arequipa)
- Manuel de Sosa y Béthencourt (1755–1765 Appointed Archbishop of Santafé en Nueva Granada)
- Diego Bernardo de Peredo y Navarrete (1765–1772 Appointed Bishop of Yucatán)
- Agustín de Alvarado y Castillo (1772–1775 Appointed Archbishop of Santafé en Nueva Granada)
- Blas Manuel Sobrino y Minayo (1775–1776 Appointed Bishop of Quito)
- José Fernández Díaz de la Madrid, O.F.M. (1777–1792 Appointed Bishop of Quito)
- Miguel Álvarez Cortés (1792–1795 Appointed Bishop of Quito)
- Jerónimo Gómez de Liñán de la Borda (1796–1805 Died)
- Custodio Angel Díaz Merino, O.P. (1806–1815 Died)
- Gregorio Rodríguez Carrillo, O.S.Bas. (1816–1828 Died)
- Juan Fernández y Sotomayor Picón (1831–1849 Died)
- Pedro Antonio Torres (1850–1853 Appointed Bishop of Popayán)
- Bernardino Medina y Moreno (1856–1877 Died)
- Juan Nepomuceno Rueda Rueda (1877–1878 Resigned)
- Manuel Cerón (1879–1880 Died)
- Eugenio Biffi, P.I.M.E. (1882–1896 Died)
- Pedro Adán Brioschi (Pietro-Adamo Brioschi), P.I.M.E. (1898–1943 Died)

Archdiocese of Cartagena

Elevated June 20, 1900

- Pedro Adán (Pietro-Adamo) Brioschi, P.I.M.E. (1898 – 13 Nov 1943 Died)
- José Ignacio López Umaña (1943–1974 Died)
- Rubén Isaza Restrepo (1974–1983 Retired)
- Carlos José Ruiseco Vieira (1983–2005 Resigned)
- Jorge Enrique Jiménez Carvajal, C.I.M. (2005–2021 Retired)
- Francisco Javier Múnera Correa, I.M.C. (2021–present)

=== Coadjutor archbishops ===
- José Ignacio López Umaña (1942–1943)
- Rubén Isaza Restrepo (1967–1974)
- Jorge Enrique Jiménez Carvajal, C.I.M. (2004–2005)

=== Auxiliary bishops ===
- Tulio Botero Salazar, C.M. (1949–1952), appointed Bishop of Zipaquirá
- Rubén Isaza Restrepo (1952–1956), appointed Bishop of Montería (later returned here as Coadjutor and Archbishop)
- Germán Villa Gaviria, C.I.M. (1956–1959), appointed Bishop of Barranquilla
- Alfonso Uribe Jaramillo (1963–1968), appointed Bishop of Sonsón-Rionegro
- Félix María Torres Parra (1966–1967), appointed Coadjutor Bishop of Santa Rosa de Osos
- Ismael Rueda Sierra (2000–2003), appointed Bishop of Socorro y San Gil

=== Other priests of this diocese who became bishops ===
- José Soleibe Arbeláez, appointed Auxiliary Bishop of Cali in 1999
- Ariel Lascarro Tapia, appointed Bishop of Magangué in 2014

== Suffragan dioceses ==
- Magangué
- Montelíbano
- Montería
- Sincelejo

== See also ==
- Roman Catholicism in Colombia
