= Cristóbal de Torres =

Spanish-born Catholic prelate (1573–1654)

The Most Reverend Cristóbal de Torres, OP
- Archbishop of Santafé en Nueva Granada
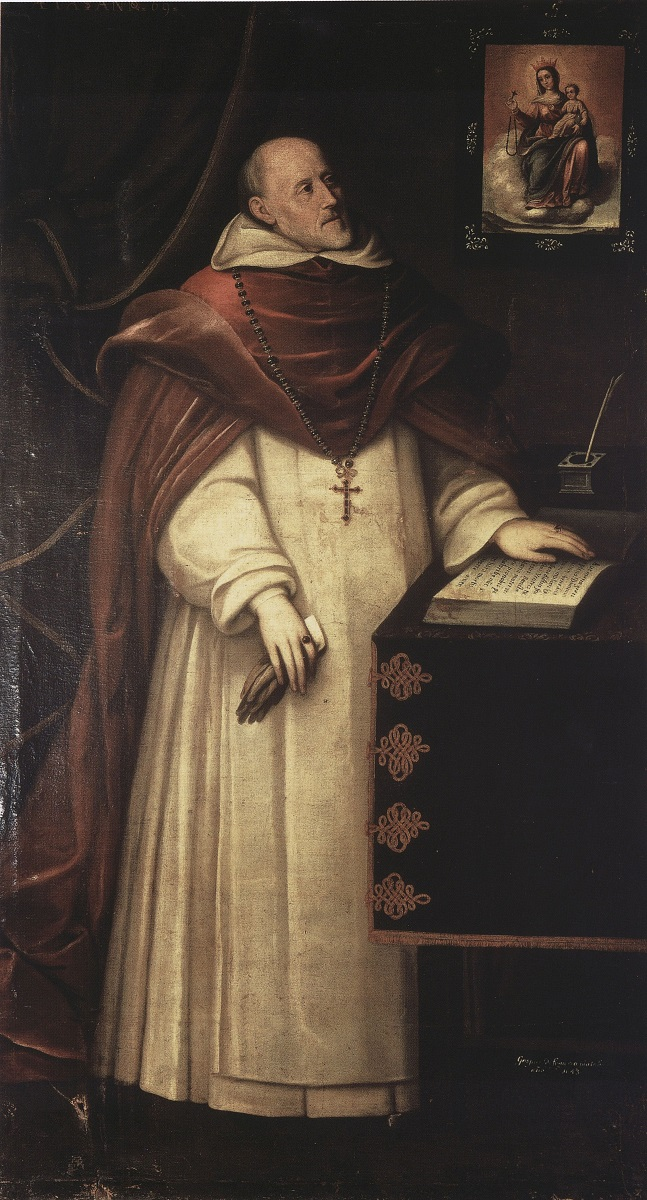
- Cristóbal de Torres (1643) by Gaspar de Figueroa
- Archdiocese: Santafé en Nueva Granada
- Appointed: 8 January 1635
- Term ended: 8 July 1654
- Predecessor: Bernardino de Almansa Carrión
- Successor: Juan de Arguinao y Gutiérrez, OP

Orders
- Ordination: March 1590
- Consecration: 1635 by Luis Córdoba Ronquillo, O.SS.T

Personal details
- Born: 27 December 1573 Burgos, Castile, Spain
- Died: 8 July 1654 (aged 80) Bogotá, Viceroyalty of Peru

Cristóbal de Torres y Motones, OP (27 December 1573 – 8 July 1654) was a Spanish-born prelate of the Catholic Church in New Spain. A member of the Dominican Order, in 1635 he was appointed archbishop of the Archdiocese of Santafé en Nueva Granada (now the Archdiocese of Bogotá). There, he was one of the first bishops in New Spain to admit indigenous people to communion, and he later founded Del Rosario University in Bogotá.

== Biography ==
=== Early life and education ===
Cristóbal de Torres y Motones was born in Burgos, Spain, on 27 December 1573. His father, Juan de Torres, was a nobleman and a notary, and his mother, Águeda de Motones, was of Flemish descent.

Torres entered the Dominican Order and in 1599, received the habit at age 16. He studied in Salamanca, and was ordained a priest in March 1590 in the Monastery of San Pablo in Burgos.

=== Priesthood ===
After ordination, Torres began his career as an educator, at first as a professor of arts and theology at his monastery in Burgos, and later as a theology instructor at San Pedro Mártir Monastery in Toledo, and finally as master of students at San Ildefnso el Real Monastery in Toro. He was elected twice to serve as prior of his monastery.

In 1614, the bishop of Córdoba, Diego Mardones, a Dominican, admonished Torres for preaching a sermon supporting the position of St. Thomas Aquinas regarding the redemption and salvation of Mary. Torres argued that Mary was, like all people, the object of the Christ's redemption and salvation, as opposed to "immaculatists" who excluded Mary from the redeemed. After the bishop's admonition, Torres recanted his views.

Despite this controversy, Torres' career was not hurt, and in January 1617, was appointed by King Philip III, 'Preacher of His Majesty.' He moved to Madrid to serve the royal court, and became close to the king and other influential persons of the time, like the king's favorite, the Duke of Lerma, whom Torres served as confessor and advisor. The Duke of Lerma fell from influence in 1618, and Torres left the ensuing turmoil to return to his monastery in Burgos. He returned to Madrid only in 1621, where the new king, Philip IV, confirmed him as the 'Royal Preacher. He soon became an advisor to the Count-Duke of Olivares, the new favorite. In 1627 he was appointed definitor for the Dominican Order's provincial chapter in Toro, the same year in which he wrote his well-known work, the Sermons of Saint Teresa.

=== Episcopacy ===
On 2 April 1634 King Philip IV named Torres to be archbishop of Santafé en Nueva Granada. He was appointed archbishop by Pope Urban VIII on 8 January 1635. He arrived in Bogotá, New Spain, in what is now Colombia, on 8 September 1635. His episcopal consecration took place in 1635, with Luis Córdoba Ronquillo, O.SS.T, the bishop of Córdoba, serving as principal consecrator.

Immediately upon arrival, the issue of church-state relations in Bogotá were brought to Torres' attention. Conflicts had arisen between Torres' predecessor, Bernardino de Almansa Carrión, and the Marquis of Sofraga, the governor. It was in hopes of amending these unresolved disputes that King Philip IV chose Torres, a trusted member of his court, as the new archbishop. The issue lied in the royal patronage of the church, which colonial officials often perceived as causing the Church's excessive interference in state affairs, and leading to a conflict of influence. Torres' first confrontation with the Marquis of Sofraga, Martin de Saavedra y Guzmán, was caused when the marquis ordered the archbishop not to preach without a government presence, and also that the archbishop and the priests of the cathedral sit on benches during Mass, while state officials sat on chairs. Torres sent a letter imploring Philip IV to rectify the situation, and the king responded by attesting that Torres could preach "anywhere under the sun," but that only the governor and the archbishop should sit in chairs, and everyone else on benches.

In addition to improving relations with the colonial government, Torres established many Catholic institutions in Bogotá and improved the conditions of Indians there. He established the Academia de Santo Tomás in 1635, and brought the Brothers Hospitallers of St. John of God to administer the Hospital of San Pedro. He founded two Discalced Carmelite convents, one in Villa de Leyva and another in Santa Inés, Bogotá. In addition, Torres was the first bishop in the New World to admit Indians to communion, or participation the sacrament of the Eucharist. He began admitting them upon his arrival in 1636, regarding the denial of the Eucharist to Indians a "pernicious abuse." To improve health conditions amongst Indians, Torres established for them a pharmacy. In 1654, he was principle consecrator of Alfonso de la Peña y Montenegro, Bishop of Quito.

==== Founding Del Rosario University ====
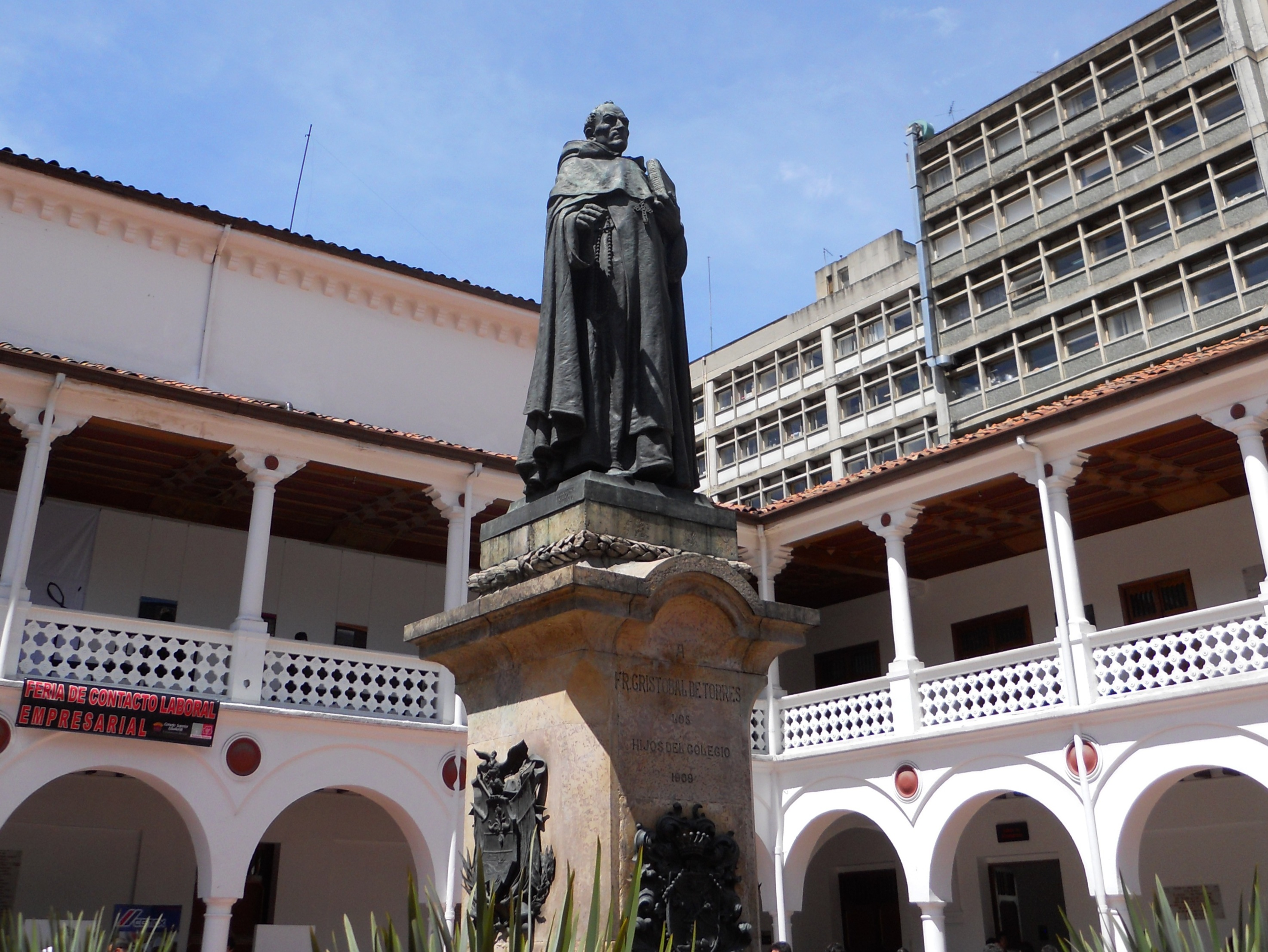
Statue of Cristóbal de Torres on the campus of Del Rosario University.

As early as 1637 and throughout his term as archbishop, Torres wished to create an institution of higher learning to address the absence of scholars and doctors in New Granada. In 1647, Torres requested the approval of King Philip IV to found a college in Bogotá modeled after the University of Salamanca in Salamanca. The king authorized the college's establishment through a royal decree on 13 December 1651. Funds for the college's endowment were provided by Torres from his personal assets. Regarding his gift to the college, Torres wrote:

"Recognizing that all the haciendas we have donated to this college, we have received from this kingdom, and it was a kind of justice and gratitude to return it all so that noble people could grow in the letters."

On 18 December 1653 the Colegio Mayor de Nuestra Señora del Rosario (English: Major College of Our Lady of the Rosary) was established and opened for the first time. There were faculties of theology, philosophy, law, medicine, but the faculty of medicine did not begin accepting students until 1753. The college accepted students from the upper classes, including seminarians as well as lay Spaniards. The inclusion of lay students and Torres' refusal to give the college to the Dominican Order created great enmity between him and the Order, to the point that the Dominicans took legal action against him and the college. The lawsuit lasted until after Torres' death and was settled by the Spanish king against the Dominican Order, thus maintaining the college's autonomy and tradition of educating lay students.

Torres died in Bogotá on 8 July 1654, at the age of 80. Because of his devotion the Mary and the rosary, Torres was given the title 'Restorer of the Rosary. His legacy lives on at Del Rosario University, where he is commemorated through a prominent statue on campus, as well as several plaques and plaster coats of arms on campus buildings. In addition, he left behind several written works, many of which are archived at the university he founded.

== Episcopal lineage ==
- Cardinal Guillaume d'Estouteville, OSB
- Pope Sixtus IV (1471)
- Pope Julius II (1481)
- Cardinal Raffaele Riario (1504)
- Pope Leo X (1513)
- Cardinal Alessandro Farnese (1519)
- Cardinal Francesco Pisani (1527)
- Cardinal Alfonso Gesualdo (1564)
- Pope Clement VIII (1592)
- Cardinal Pietro Aldobrandini (1604)
- Bishop Juan Bravo Lagunas, OSA (1616)
- Archbishop Bernardino de Almansa Carrión (1629)
- Bishop Luis Córdoba Ronquillo, O.SS.T (1631)
- Archbishop Cristóbal de Torres, OP (1635)

== Bibliography ==
- Sermones de Santa Teresa [Sermons of Saint Teresa] (in Spanish). Madrid. 1627.
- Sermones de Cuaresma [Sermons of Lent] (in Spanish).
- El Ave María (in Spanish). (6 volumes)
- Cuna Mystica, pequeñez de las glorias del Santísimo Rosario [Mystic Cradle, Smallness of the Glories of the Holy Rosary] (in Spanish). Madrid.
- Exposición de la doctrina del Angélico Santo Tomás de Aquino sobre la Eucaristía [Exposition of the Doctrine of the Angelic St. Thomas Aquinas on the Eucharist] (in Spanish). 1636.
- Lengua Eucarística del hombre bueno [Eucharistic Language of the Good Man] (in Spanish). Madrid. 1665.

== External links and additional sources ==
- Cheney, David M. "Archdiocese of Bogotá". Catholic-Hierarchy.org. (for Chronology of Bishops) ^{[self-published]}
- Chow, Gabriel. "Metropolitan Archdiocese of Bogotá (Colombia)". GCatholic.org. (for Chronology of Bishops) ^{[self-published]}
