= Diego Montoya Mendoza =

Most Reverend Diego Montoya Mendoza
- Bishop of Trujillo
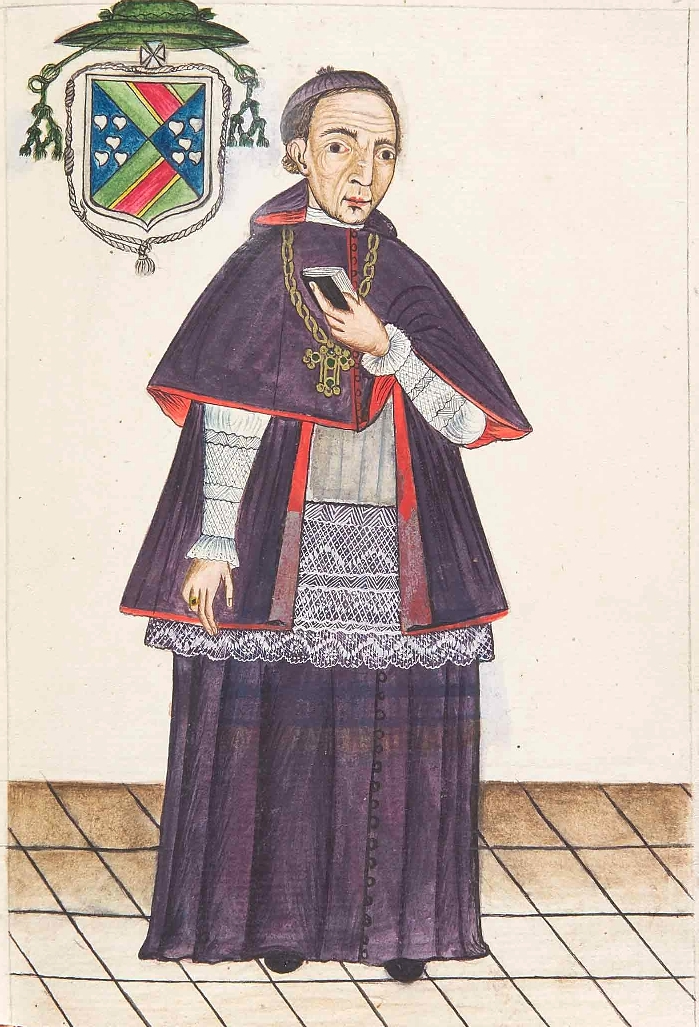
- Church: Catholic Church
- In office: 1637–1640
- Predecessor: Ambrosio Vallejo Mejía
- Successor: Luis Córdoba Ronquillo
- Previous post: Bishop of Popayán (1633–1637)

Orders
- Consecration: 27 December 1634 by Pedro de Oviedo Falconi

Personal details
- Born: 23 July 1593 Mijancas, Spain
- Died: 14 April 1640 (age 46) Trujillo, Peru

Diego Montoya Mendoza (23 July 1593 – 14 April 1640) was a Roman Catholic prelate who served as Bishop of Trujillo (1637–1640) and Bishop of Popayán (1633–1637).

== Biography ==
Diego Montoya Mendoza was born in Mijancas, Spain on 23 July 1593. On 5 September 1633, he was appointed during the papacy of Pope Urban VIII as Bishop of Popayán. On 27 December 1634, he was consecrated bishop by Pedro de Oviedo Falconi, Bishop of Quito. On 20 February 1637, he was selected by the King of Spain and confirmed by Pope Urban VIII on 5 Oct 1637. He served as Bishop of Trujillo until his death on 14 April 1640. Two days after his death on 16 July 1640, he was appointed as Bishop of Cuzco by Pope Urban VIII.

== External links and additional sources ==
- Cheney, David M. "Archdiocese of Trujillo". Catholic-Hierarchy.org. (for Chronology of Bishops) ^{[self-published]}
- Chow, Gabriel. "Metropolitan Archdiocese of Trujillo (Peru)". GCatholic.org. (for Chronology of Bishops) ^{[self-published]}
- Cheney, David M. "Diocese of Popayán". Catholic-Hierarchy.org. (for Chronology of Bishops) ^{[self-published]}
- Chow, Gabriel. "Metropolitan Diocese of Popayán (Colombia)". GCatholic.org. (for Chronology of Bishops) ^{[self-published]}
- Cheney, David M. "Archdiocese of Cuzco". Catholic-Hierarchy.org. (for Chronology of Bishops) ^{[self-published]}
- Chow, Gabriel. "Metropolitan Archdiocese of Cusco (Peru)". GCatholic.org. (for Chronology of Bishops) ^{[self-published]}

Catholic Church titles
Preceded by Feliciano de la Vega Padilla	Bishop of Popayán; 1633–1637	Succeeded by Francisco de la Serna
Preceded by Ambrosio Vallejo Mejía	Bishop of Trujillo; 1637–1640	Succeeded by Luis Córdoba Ronquillo
Preceded by Fernando de Vera y Zuñiga	Bishop of Cuzco; Died 2 days before appointment	Succeeded by Juan Alonso y Ocón
