= Hernando de Arias y Ugarte =

Spanish Neogranadine Roman Catholic prelate

The Most Reverend Hernando de Arias y Ugarte
- Archbishop of Lima
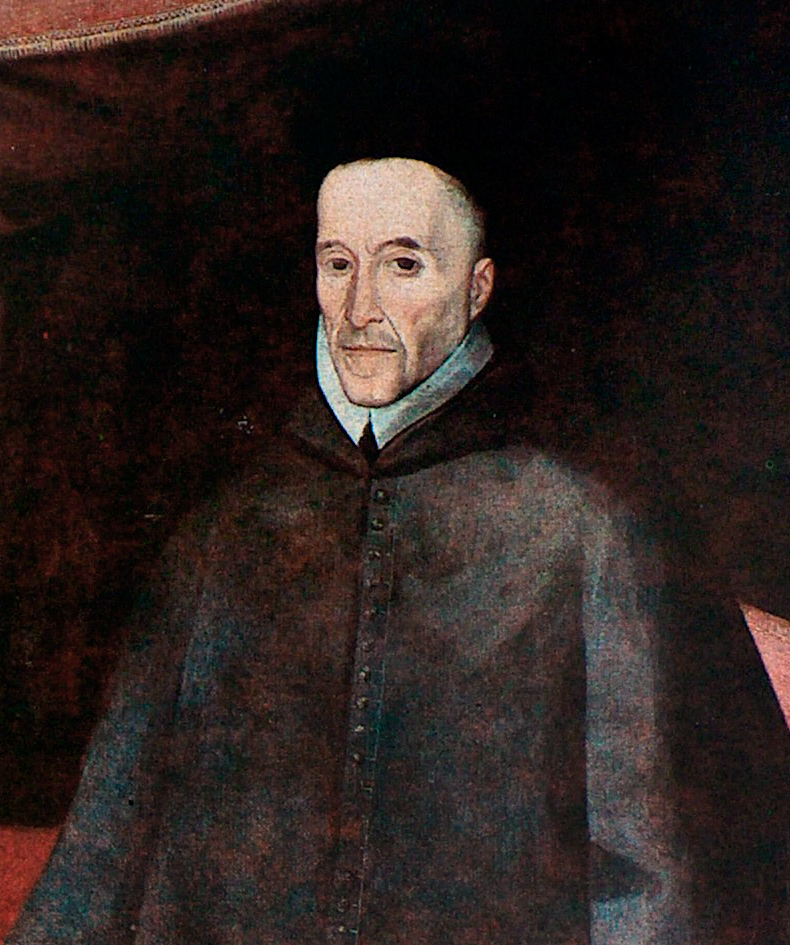
- Church: Catholic Church
- Diocese: Archbishop of Lima
- In office: 1628–1638
- Predecessor: Gonzalo del Campo
- Successor: Pedro de Villagómez Vivanco
- Previous posts: Archbishop of La Plata o Charcas (1624–1628); Archbishop of Santafé en Nueva Granada (1616–1625); Bishop of Quito (1613–1616)

Orders
- Consecration: September 28, 1614 by Bartolomé Lobo Guerrero

Personal details
- Born: September 9, 1561 Bogotá
- Died: January 27, 1638 (aged 76)

Hernando de Arias y Ugarte (September 9, 1561 – January 27, 1638) was a Spanish Neogranadine Roman Catholic prelate who served as Archbishop of Lima (1628–1638), Archbishop of La Plata o Charcas (1624–1628), Archbishop of Santafé en Nueva Granada (1616–1625), and Bishop of Quito (1613–1616).

== Biography ==
Hernando de Arias y Ugarte was born in Bogotá. On April 22, 1613, Pope Paul V, appointed him Bishop of Quito. On September 28, 1614, he was consecrated bishop by Bartolomé Lobo Guerrero, Archbishop of Lima. On March 14, 1616, Pope Paul V, appointed him Archbishop of Santafé en Nueva Granada. On April 15, 1624, Pope Urban VIII, appointed him Bishop of La Plata o Charcas. On March 4, 1628, Pope Urban VIII appointed him Archbishop of Lima where he served until his death on January 27, 1638.

== Episcopal succession ==
While bishop, he was the principal consecrator of:

- Leonel de Cervantes y Caravajal, Bishop of Santa Marta;
- Feliciano de la Vega Padilla, Bishop of Popayán;
- Melchor Maldonado y Saavedra, Bishop of Córdoba;
- Pedro de Villagómez Vivanco, Bishop of Arequipa; and
- Francisco de la Serna, Bishop of Paraguay.

== External links and additional sources ==
- Chow, Gabriel. "Metropolitan Archdiocese of Concepción (Chile)". GCatholic.org. (for Chronology of Bishops) ^{[self-published]}
- Cheney, David M. "Archdiocese of Quito". Catholic-Hierarchy.org. (for Chronology of Bishops) ^{[self-published]}
- Cheney, David M. "Archdiocese of Bogotá". Catholic-Hierarchy.org. (for Chronology of Bishops) ^{[self-published]}
- Chow, Gabriel. "Metropolitan Archdiocese of Bogotá (Colombia)". GCatholic.org. (for Chronology of Bishops) ^{[self-published]}
- Cheney, David M. "Archdiocese of Sucre". Catholic-Hierarchy.org. (for Chronology of Bishops) ^{[self-published]}
- Chow, Gabriel. "Metropolitan Archdiocese of Sucre (Bolivia)". GCatholic.org. (for Chronology of Bishops) ^{[self-published]}
- Cheney, David M. "Archdiocese of Lima". Catholic-Hierarchy.org. (for Chronology of Bishops) ^{[self-published]}
- Chow, Gabriel. "Metropolitan Archdiocese of Lima (Peru)". GCatholic.org. (for Chronology of Bishops) ^{[self-published]}

Religious titles
Preceded by Salvador Ribera Avalos	Bishop of Quito; 1613–1616	Succeeded by Alfonso Santillán Fajardo
Preceded by Pedro Ordóñez y Flórez	Archbishop of Santafé en Nueva Granada; 1616–1625	Succeeded by Julián de Cortázar
Preceded by Jerónimo Tiedra Méndez	Archbishop of La Plata o Charcas; 1624–1628	Succeeded by Francisco Sotomayor
Preceded by Gonzalo del Campo	Archbishop of Lima; 1628–1638	Succeeded by Pedro de Villagómez Vivanco
