= Pedro de Villagómez Vivanco =

Roman Catholic prelate (1589–1671)

Most Reverend Pedro de Villagómez Vivanco
- Archbishop of Lima
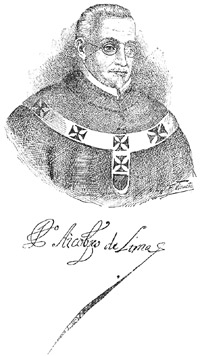
- Church: Catholic Church
- Diocese: Archbishop of Lima
- In office: 1640–1671
- Predecessor: Hernando de Arias y Ugarte
- Successor: Juan de Almoguera
- Previous post: Bishop of Arequipa (1632–1640)

Orders
- Consecration: September 25, 1633 by Hernando de Arias y Ugarte

Personal details
- Born: October 8, 1589 Castroverde del Campo, Spain
- Died: May 12, 1671 (aged 81)

Pedro de Villagómez Vivanco (October 8, 1589 – May 12, 1671) was a Roman Catholic prelate who served as Archbishop of Lima (1640–1671) and Bishop of Arequipa (1632–1640).

== Biography ==
Pedro de Villagómez Vivanco was born in Castroverde del Campo, Spain. On January 6, 1632, Pope Urban VIII, appointed him Bishop of Arequipa. On September 25, 1633, he was consecrated bishop by Hernando de Arias y Ugarte, Archbishop of Lima with Feliciano de la Vega Padilla, Bishop of La Paz, and Melchor Maldonado y Saavedra, Bishop of Córdoba as co-consecrators. On July 16, 1640, Pope Urban VIII, appointed him Archbishop of Lima where he served until his death on May 12, 1671.

== Episcopal succession ==
While bishop, he was the principal consecrator of:

- José Valle de la Cerda, Bishop of Almería (1638);
- Bartolomé de Benavente y Benavides, Bishop of Antequera (1640);
- Cristóbal de la Mancha y Velazco, Bishop of Buenos Aires (1645);
- Pedro de Ortega y Sotomayor, Bishop of Trujillo (1646);
- Juan de Arguinao y Gutiérrez, Bishop of Santa Cruz de la Sierra (1647);
- Andrés García de Zurita, Coadjutor Bishop of Ayacucho o Huamanga (1649);
- Francisco de Godoy, Bishop of Ayacucho o Huamanga (1652);
- Dionisio de Cimbrón, Bishop of Concepción (1654);
- Martín Velasco y Molina, Bishop of La Paz (1655);
- Vasco Jacinto de Contreras y Valverde, Bishop of Popayán (1658);
- Cipriano Medina, Bishop of Ayacucho o Huamanga (1661);
- Diego de Humansoro Carantía, Bishop of Santiago de Chile (1662);
- Juan de la Calle y Heredia, Bishop of Trujillo (1662);
- Sancho Pardo Cárdenas y Figueroa, Bishop of Panamá (1665);
- Martín de Montalvo Calderon de la Barca, Bishop of La Paz (1668);
- Cristóbal de Castilla y Zamora, Bishop of Ayacucho o Huamanga (1669); and
- Francisco de Loyola y Vergara, Bishop of Concepción (1671).

== External links and additional sources ==
- Cheney, David M. "Archdiocese of Arequipa". Catholic-Hierarchy.org. (for Chronology of Bishops) ^{[self-published]}
- Chow, Gabriel. "Metropolitan Archdiocese of Arequipa". GCatholic.org. (for Chronology of Bishops) ^{[self-published]}
- Cheney, David M. "Archdiocese of Lima". Catholic-Hierarchy.org. (for Chronology of Bishops) ^{[self-published]}
- Chow, Gabriel. "Metropolitan Archdiocese of Lima (Peru)". GCatholic.org. (for Chronology of Bishops) ^{[self-published]}

Catholic Church titles
Preceded by Pedro de Perea	Bishop of Arequipa; 1632–1640	Succeeded by Agustín de Ugarte y Sarabia
Preceded by Hernando de Arias y Ugarte	Archbishop of Lima; 1640–1671	Succeeded by Juan de Almoguera
