= Francisco Sotomayor =

Roman Catholic prelate (died 1630)

Most Reverend Francisco Sotomayor
- Archbishop of La Plata o Charcas
- Church: Catholic Church
- Archdiocese: Archdiocese of La Plata o Charcas
- In office: 1628–1630
- Predecessor: Hernando de Arias y Ugarte
- Successor: Francisco Vega Borja
- Previous posts: Bishop of Cartagena in Colombia (1623); Bishop of Quito (1623–1628)

Orders
- Consecration: August 18, 1624 by Gonzalo del Campo

Personal details
- Born: Santo Tomé, Spain
- Died: February 5, 1630 Sucre, Peru

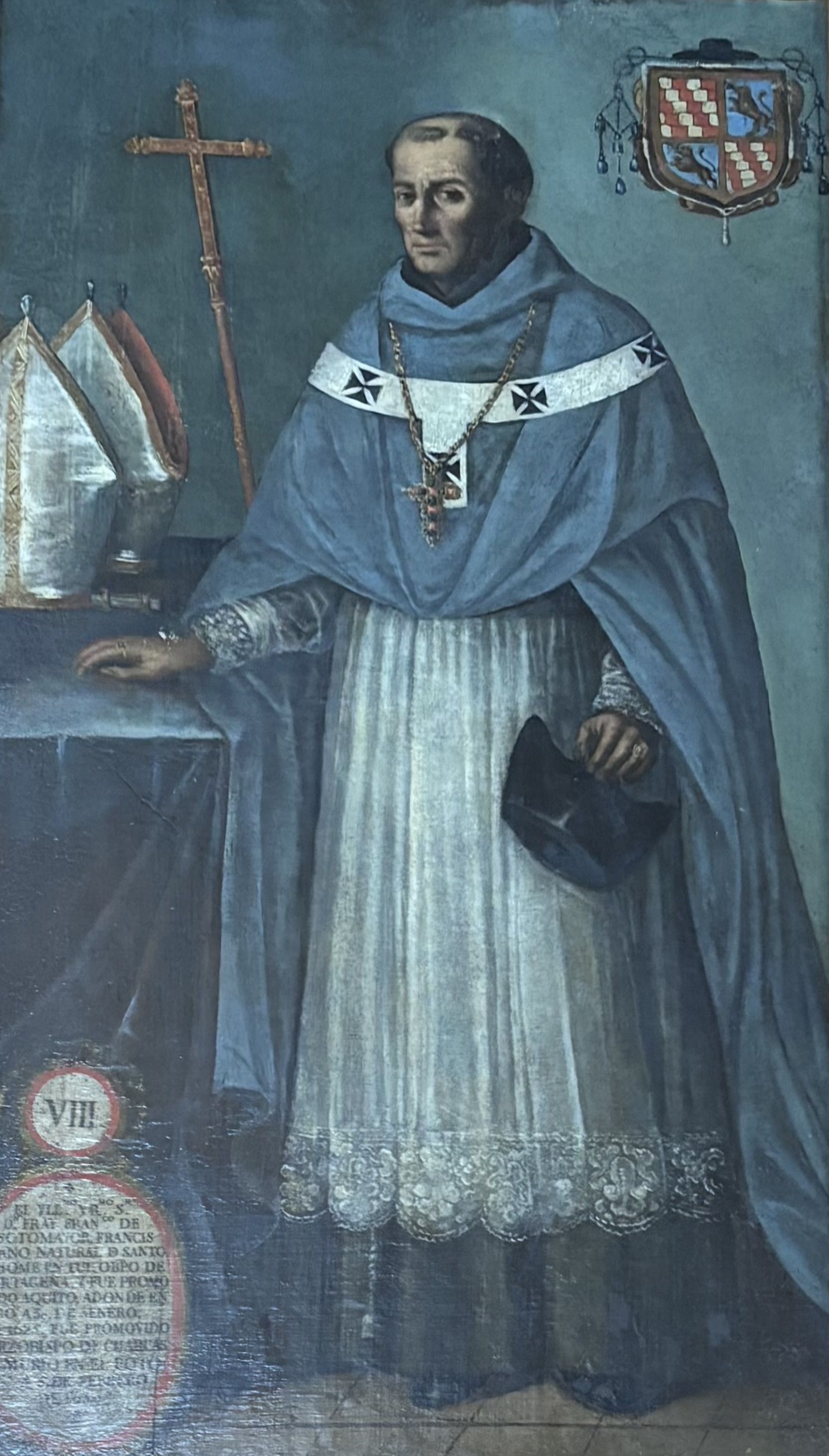

Francisco Sotomayor, O.F.M. (died February 5, 1630) was a Roman Catholic prelate who served as the Archbishop of La Plata o Charcas (1628–1630), the Bishop of Quito (1623–1628), and the Bishop of Cartagena in Colombia (1623).

== Biography ==
Francisco Sotomayor was born in Santo Tomé, Spain ordained a priest in the Order of Friars Minor. On May 22, 1623, he was appointed by the King of Spain as Bishop of Cartagena in Colombia. On May 22, 1623, he was appointed by the King of Spain and confirmed by Pope Urban VIII as Bishop of Quito. On August 18, 1624, he was consecrated bishop by Gonzalo del Campo, Archbishop of Lima. On June 5, 1628, he was appointed by the King of Spain and confirmed by Pope Urban VIII as Bishop of La Plata o Charcas. He served as Bishop of La Plata o Charcas until his death on February 5, 1630.

== External links and additional sources ==
- Cheney, David M. "Archdiocese of Cartagena". Catholic-Hierarchy.org. (for Chronology of Bishops) ^{[self-published]}
- Chow, Gabriel. "Metropolitan Archdiocese of Cartagena". GCatholic.org. (for Chronology of Bishops) ^{[self-published]}
- Chow, Gabriel. "Metropolitan Archdiocese of Concepción (Chile)". GCatholic.org. (for Chronology of Bishops) ^{[self-published]}
- Cheney, David M. "Archdiocese of Quito". Catholic-Hierarchy.org. (for Chronology of Bishops) ^{[self-published]}
- Cheney, David M. "Archdiocese of Sucre". Catholic-Hierarchy.org. (for Chronology of Bishops) ^{[self-published]}
- Chow, Gabriel. "Metropolitan Archdiocese of Sucre (Bolivia)". GCatholic.org. (for Chronology of Bishops) ^{[self-published]}

Catholic Church titles
Preceded by Diego Torres Altamirano	Bishop of Cartagena in Colombia; 1623	Succeeded by Diego Ramirez de Cepeda
Preceded by Alfonso Santillán Fajardo	Bishop of Quito; 1623–1628	Succeeded by Pedro de Oviedo Falconi
Preceded by Hernando de Arias y Ugarte	Archbishop of La Plata o Charcas; 1628–1630	Succeeded by Francisco Vega Borja
