= Bartolomé Lobo Guerrero =

Spanish Catholic Archbishop of Lima

The Most Reverend Bartolomé Lobo Guerrero
- Archbishop of Lima
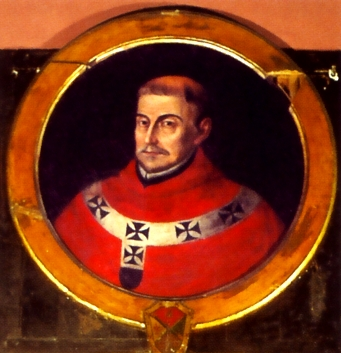
- Church: Catholic Church
- Diocese: Archbishop of Lima
- In office: 1607–1622
- Predecessor: Saint Turibius de Mogrovejo
- Successor: Gonzalo del Campo (López de Ocampo)
- Previous post: Archbishop of Santafé en Nueva Granada (1596–1607)

Orders
- Consecration: August 24, 1596 by Diego de Romano y Govea

Personal details
- Born: 1546 Ronda Spain
- Died: January 12, 1622 (age 76)

Bartolomé Lobo Guerrero (1546 – January 12, 1622) was a Roman Catholic prelate who served as Archbishop of Lima (1607–1622), after serving as the second Archbishop of Santafé (Bogotá) in the New Kingdom of Granada (1596–1607). As Archbishop of Lima, Lobo Guerrero is considered the initiator of the "first systematic, centrally organized campaign for the extirpation of idolatry in the archdiocese of Lima."

== Biography ==
Bartolomé Lobo Guerrero was born in Ronda, Spain. On August 12, 1596, Pope Clement VIII, appointed him Archbishop of Archbishop of Santafé en Nueva Granada. On August 24, 1596, he was consecrated bishop by Diego de Romano y Govea, Bishop of Tlaxcala (Puebla de los Angeles). During his time in Mexico, he served as an interrogator for the Mexican Inquisition and participated, along with Alonso de Peralta and Juan de Cervantes, in the torture of accused Judaizer Luis de Carvajal the Younger and others. On November 19, 1607, Pope Paul V, appointed him the fourth Archbishop of Lima (installed October 4, 1609) where he served until his death on January 12, 1622.

== Episcopal succession ==
While bishop, he was the principal consecrator of:

- Pedro Ordóñez y Flórez, Archbishop of Santafé en Nueva Granada;
- Hernando de Arias y Ugarte, Bishop of Quito;
- Pedro de Valencia, Bishop of Santiago de Guatemala;
- Diego Torres Altamirano, Bishop of Cartagena;
- Carlos Marcelo Corni Velazquez, Bishop of Concepción; and
- Fernando de Ocampo, Bishop of Santa Cruz de la Sierra.

== External links and additional sources ==
- Cheney, David M. "Archdiocese of Bogotá". Catholic-Hierarchy.org. (for Chronology of Bishops) ^{[self-published]}
- Chow, Gabriel. "Metropolitan Archdiocese of Bogotá (Colombia)". GCatholic.org. (for Chronology of Bishops) ^{[self-published]}
- Cheney, David M. "Archdiocese of Lima". Catholic-Hierarchy.org. (for Chronology of Bishops) ^{[self-published]}
- Chow, Gabriel. "Metropolitan Archdiocese of Lima (Peru)". GCatholic.org. (for Chronology of Bishops) ^{[self-published]}

Religious titles
Preceded by Bartolomé Martinez Menacho y Mesa	Archbishop of Santafé en Nueva Granada; 1596–1607	Succeeded by Juan Castro
Preceded by Saint Turibius de Mogrovejo	Archbishop of Lima; 1607–1622	Succeeded by Gonzalo del Campo
