= Diego Ramirez de Cepeda =

Most Reverend Diego Ramirez de Cepeda
- Bishop of Cartagena
- Church: Catholic Church
- Diocese: Diocese of Cartagena in Colombia
- In office: 1624–1629
- Predecessor: Francisco Sotomayor
- Successor: Luis Córdoba Ronquillo

Personal details
- Born: Lima, Peru
- Died: 1629 Cartagena, Colombia

Diego Ramirez de Cepeda (died 1629) was a Roman Catholic prelate who served as Bishop of Cartagena in Colombia (1624–1629).

== Biography ==
Diego Ramirez de Cepeda was born in Lima, Peru. On 15 July 1624, he was appointed during the papacy of Pope Urban VIII as Bishop of Cartagena in Colombia. He served as Bishop of Cartagena in Colombia until his death in 1629.

== External links and additional sources ==
- Cheney, David M. "Archdiocese of Cartagena". Catholic-Hierarchy.org. (for Chronology of Bishops) ^{[self-published]}
- Chow, Gabriel. "Metropolitan Archdiocese of Cartagena". GCatholic.org. (for Chronology of Bishops) ^{[self-published]}

Catholic Church titles
Preceded by Francisco Sotomayor	Bishop of Cartagena in Colombia; 1624–1629	Succeeded by Luis Córdoba Ronquillo
