= Juan Castro (bishop) =

Roman Catholic prelate (1547–1611)

The Most Reverend Juan Castro OSA
- Archbishop of Santafé en Nueva Granada
- Church: Catholic Church
- Archdiocese: Santafé en Nueva Granada
- In office: 1608–1609
- Predecessor: Bartolomé Lobo Guerrero
- Successor: Pedro Ordóñez y Flórez

Personal details
- Born: 25 January 1547 Toledo, Spain
- Died: 1 August 1611 (aged 64) Bogotá

Juan Castro OSA (25 January 1547 – 1 August 1611) was a Roman Catholic prelate who served as Archbishop of Santafé en Nueva Granada (1608–1609).

== Biography ==
Luis Zapata de Cárdenas was born in Toledo, Spain on 25 Jan 1547 and ordained a priest in the Order of Saint Augustine. On 7 Jan 1608, he was appointed during the papacy of Pope Paul V as Archbishop of Santafé en Nueva Granada. He served as Archbishop of Santafé en Nueva Granada until his resignation in Jun 1609. He died on 1 Aug 1611.

== External links and additional sources ==
- Cheney, David M. "Archdiocese of Bogotá". Catholic-Hierarchy.org. (for Chronology of Bishops) ^{[self-published]}
- Chow, Gabriel. "Metropolitan Archdiocese of Bogotá (Colombia)". GCatholic.org. (for Chronology of Bishops) ^{[self-published]}

Catholic Church titles
Preceded by Bartolomé Lobo Guerrero	Archbishop of Santafé en Nueva Granada; 1608–1609	Succeeded by Pedro Ordóñez y Flórez
