= Luis Sánchez-Moreno Lira =

Peruvian Roman Catholic archbishop (1925–2009)

The Most Reverend Luis Sánchez-Moreno Lira
- Archbishop Emeritus of Arequipa
- Archdiocese: Arequipa
- Appointed: 2 March 1996
- Term ended: 29 November 2003
- Predecessor: Fernando Vargas Ruiz de Somocurcio
- Successor: Javier Del Río Alba

Orders
- Ordination: 4 August 1957
- Consecration: 30 April 1961 by Romolo Carboni

Personal details
- Born: November 12, 1925 Arequipa, Peru
- Died: September 28, 2009 (aged 83) Lima, Peru
- Denomination: Roman Catholic
- Motto: "In Laetitia Nulla Dies Sine Cruce"

Luis Sánchez-Moreno Lira (12 November 1925 – 28 September 2009) was a Peruvian Roman Catholic prelate who served as the Metropolitan Archbishop of Arequipa from 1996 to 2003. A member of Opus Dei, he previously held positions as Auxiliary Bishop of Chiclayo and Bishop-Prelate of Yauyos.

== Early life and education ==
Luis Sánchez-Moreno Lira was born in Arequipa, Peru. He studied law at the National University of Saint Augustine in Arequipa, graduating in 1948. He later earned doctorates in Civil Law (Madrid) and Canon Law (Rome), and a degree in journalism in Spain. He joined Opus Dei in 1950 and was ordained a priest on 4 August 1957 in Madrid.

== Episcopal ministry ==
=== Auxiliary Bishop of Chiclayo ===
On 30 April 1961, he was appointed Auxiliary Bishop of Chiclayo and Titular Bishop of Nilopolis. He was consecrated bishop that same day by Archbishop Romolo Carboni. He served in this role until 1968.

=== Bishop-Prelate of Yauyos ===
He was appointed Bishop-Prelate of Yauyos on 26 April 1968. During his nearly 30-year tenure, he founded the San José Major Seminary (1971), the Instituto Superior Pedagógico de Cañete (1982), and the Sanctuary of Our Lady Mother of Fair Love (1991). He participated in all four sessions of the Second Vatican Council.

=== Archbishop of Arequipa ===
On 2 March 1996, Pope John Paul II appointed Sánchez-Moreno Lira Archbishop of Arequipa. He oversaw renovations of seminaries and churches, including reconstruction after the 2001 earthquake. He resigned on 29 November 2003.

== Death and burial ==
He died on 28 September 2009 in Lima at the Opus Dei's Centro Cultural Olivares. He was initially buried in Cañete but later reinterred at the Sanctuary of Our Lady of Chapi in Arequipa, per his final wishes.

== Honors ==
- Medalla de Honor del Congreso de la República (Commander grade)
- Declared "Hijo Predilecto" (Favorite Son) of Arequipa
- Honorary doctorates from National University of Saint Augustine and the Catholic University of Santa María

== See also ==
- Roman Catholic Archdiocese of Arequipa
- Opus Dei
- Roman Catholic Church in Peru
