= Andrés Fernandez de Ipenza =

Most Reverend Andrés Fernandez de Ipenza
- Bishop-Elect of Yucatán
- Church: Catholic Church
- In office: 1643
- Predecessor: Juan Alonso y Ocón
- Successor: Marcos de Torres y Rueda

Personal details
- Died: 24 October 1643

Andrés Fernandez de Ipenza (died 1643) was a Roman Catholic prelate who served as Bishop-Elect of Yucatán (1643).

== Biography ==
On 9 Feb 1643, he was selected by the King of Spain and confirmed by Pope Urban VIII on 5 Oct 1643 as Bishop of Yucatán. He died on 24 Oct 1643 before he was installed to the bishopric.

== External links and additional sources ==
- Cheney, David M. "Archdiocese of Yucatán". Catholic-Hierarchy.org. (for Chronology of Bishops) ^{[self-published]}
- Chow, Gabriel. "Metropolitan Archdiocese of Yucatán". GCatholic.org. (for Chronology of Bishops) ^{[self-published]}

Catholic Church titles
Preceded by Juan Alonso y Ocón	Bishop-Elect of Yucatán; 1643	Succeeded by Marcos de Torres y Rueda
