= Bartolomé González Soltero =

Most Reverend Bartolomé González Soltero
- Bishop of Santiago de Guatemala
- Church: Catholic Church
- Diocese: Diocese of Santiago de Guatemala
- In office: 1641–1650
- Predecessor: Agustín de Ugarte y Sarabia
- Successor: Juan Garcilaso de la Vega

Orders
- Consecration: 5 July 1643

Personal details
- Born: 1580 Mexico
- Died: 25 February 1650 (age 70) Santiago de Guatemala, Guatemala

Bartolomé González Soltero (1580 – 25 February 1650) was a Roman Catholic prelate who served as Bishop of Santiago de Guatemala (1641–1650).

== Biography ==
Bartolomé González Soltero was born in Mexico in 1580.

On 1 July 1641, he was appointed during the papacy of Pope Urban VIII as Bishop of Santiago de Guatemala. On 5 July 1643, he was consecrated bishop by Bartolomé de Benavente y Benavides, Bishop of Antequera.

He served as Bishop of Santiago de Guatemala until his death on 25 February 1650.

== External links and additional sources ==
- Cheney, David M. "Archdiocese of Guatemala". Catholic-Hierarchy.org. (for Chronology of Bishops) ^{[self-published]}
- Chow, Gabriel. "Metropolitan Archdiocese of Santiago de Guatemala". GCatholic.org. (for Chronology of Bishops) ^{[self-published]}

Catholic Church titles
Preceded by Agustín de Ugarte y Sarabia	Bishop of Santiago de Guatemala; 1641–1650	Succeeded by Juan Garcilaso de la Vega
