= Pedro Ordóñez y Flórez =

Roman Catholic archbishop

The Most Reverend Pedro Ordóñez y Flórez
- Archbishop of Santafé en Nueva Granada
- Church: Catholic Church
- Archdiocese: Archdiocese of Santafé en Nueva Granada
- In office: 1610–1614
- Predecessor: Juan Castro (bishop)
- Successor: Hernando de Arias y Ugarte

Orders
- Consecration: 21 Dec 1611 by Bartolomé Lobo Guerrero

Personal details
- Born: 1560 Brozas, Spain
- Died: 11 Jun 1614 (age 44) Bogotá

Pedro Ordóñez y Flórez (1560–1614) was a Roman Catholic prelate who served as Archbishop of Santafé en Nueva Granada (1610–1614).

== Biography ==
Pedro Ordóñez y Flórez was born in Brozas, Spain in 1560. On 19 Apr 1610, he was appointed during the papacy of Pope Paul V as Archbishop of Santafé en Nueva Granada. On 21 Dec 1611, he was consecrated bishop by Bartolomé Lobo Guerrero, Archbishop of Lima. He served as Archbishop of Santafé en Nueva Granada until his death on 11 Jun 1614.

== External links and additional sources ==
- Cheney, David M. "Archdiocese of Bogotá". Catholic-Hierarchy.org. (for Chronology of Bishops) ^{[self-published]}
- Chow, Gabriel. "Metropolitan Archdiocese of Bogotá (Colombia)". GCatholic.org. (for Chronology of Bishops) ^{[self-published]}

Catholic Church titles
| Preceded by Juan Castro (bishop) | Archbishop of Santafé en Nueva Granada; 1608–1609 | Succeeded by Hernando de Arias y Ugarte |
