= Pedro de Ortega y Sotomayor =

Roman Catholic prelate (d. 1658)

The Most Reverend Pedro de Ortega y Sotomayor
- Bishop of Cuzco
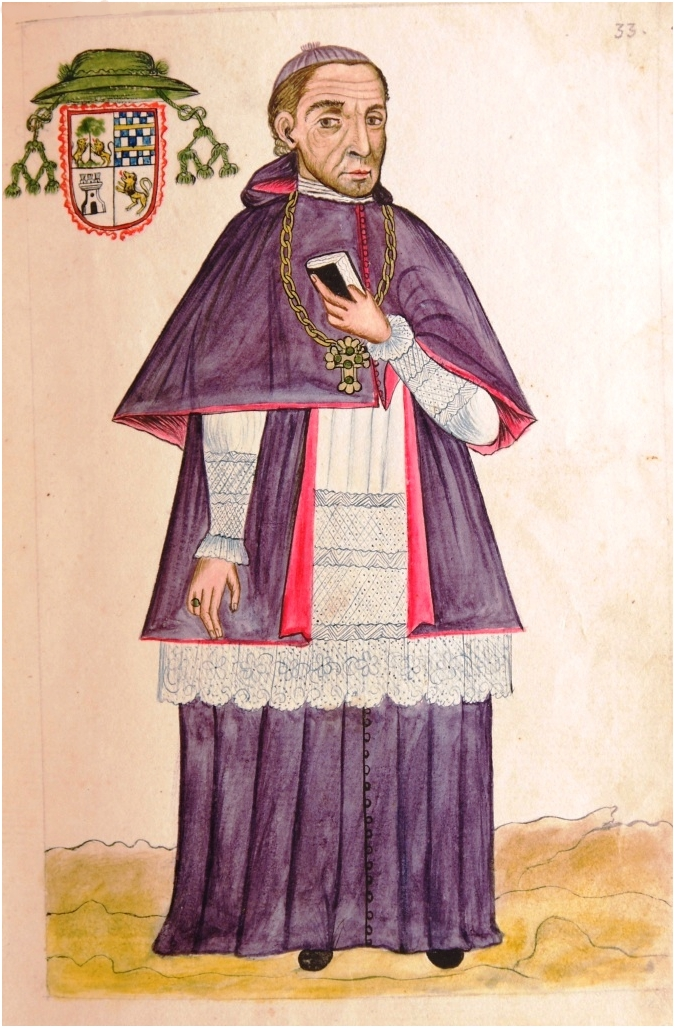
- Watercolor portrait. Reproduced from the first volume of the Codex Martínez Compañón (c.1782).
- Church: Catholic Church
- Diocese: Diocese of Cuzco
- In office: 1651–1658
- Predecessor: Juan Alonso y Ocón
- Successor: Agustín Muñoz Sandoval
- Previous posts: Bishop of Trujillo (1645–1647); Bishop of Arequipa (1647–1651)

Orders
- Consecration: 30 September 1646 by Pedro de Villagómez Vivanco

Personal details
- Born: Lima, Peru
- Died: 1658 Cuzco, Peru

Pedro de Ortega y Sotomayor (died 1658) was a Roman Catholic prelate who served as Bishop of Cuzco (1651–1658), Bishop of Arequipa (1647–1651), and Bishop of Trujillo (1645–1647).

== Biography ==
Pedro de Ortega y Sotomayor was born in Lima, Peru. On 19 February 1645, he was selected by the King of Spain as Bishop of Trujillo and on 21 August 1645 he was confirmed by Pope Innocent X. On 30 September 1646, he was consecrated bishop by Pedro de Villagómez Vivanco, Archbishop of Lima. On 26 December 1647, he was appointed during the papacy of Pope Innocent X as Bishop of Arequipa. On 27 November 1651, he was appointed during the papacy of Pope Innocent X as Bishop of Cuzco. He served as Bishop of Cuzco until his death in 1658.

While a priest, he assisted in the consecration of Francisco de la Serna, Bishop of Paraguay (1637), and Gaspar de Villarroel, Bishop of Santiago de Chile (1638).

== External links and additional sources ==
- Cheney, David M. "Archdiocese of Trujillo". Catholic-Hierarchy.org. (for Chronology of Bishops) ^{[self-published]}
- Chow, Gabriel. "Metropolitan Archdiocese of Trujillo (Peru)". GCatholic.org. (for Chronology of Bishops) ^{[self-published]}
- Cheney, David M. "Archdiocese of Arequipa". Catholic-Hierarchy.org. (for Chronology of Bishops) ^{[self-published]}
- Chow, Gabriel. "Metropolitan Archdiocese of Arequipa". GCatholic.org. (for Chronology of Bishops) ^{[self-published]}
- Cheney, David M. "Archdiocese of Cuzco". Catholic-Hierarchy.org. (for Chronology of Bishops) ^{[self-published]}
- Chow, Gabriel. "Metropolitan Archdiocese of Cusco (Peru)". GCatholic.org. (for Chronology of Bishops) ^{[self-published]}

Catholic Church titles
Preceded by Luis Córdoba Ronquillo	Bishop of Trujillo; 1645–1647	Succeeded by Andrés García de Zurita
Preceded by Agustín de Ugarte y Sarabia	Bishop of Arequipa; 1647–1651	Succeeded by Gaspar de Villarroel
Preceded by Juan Alonso y Ocón	Bishop of Cuzco; 1651–1658	Succeeded by Agustín Muñoz Sandoval
