= Archdiocese of Arequipa =

Latin Catholic archdiocese in Peru

Coordinates: 16°23′S 71°32′W

Archdiocese of Arequipa Archidioecesis Arequipensis Arquidiócesis de Arequipa

Catholic
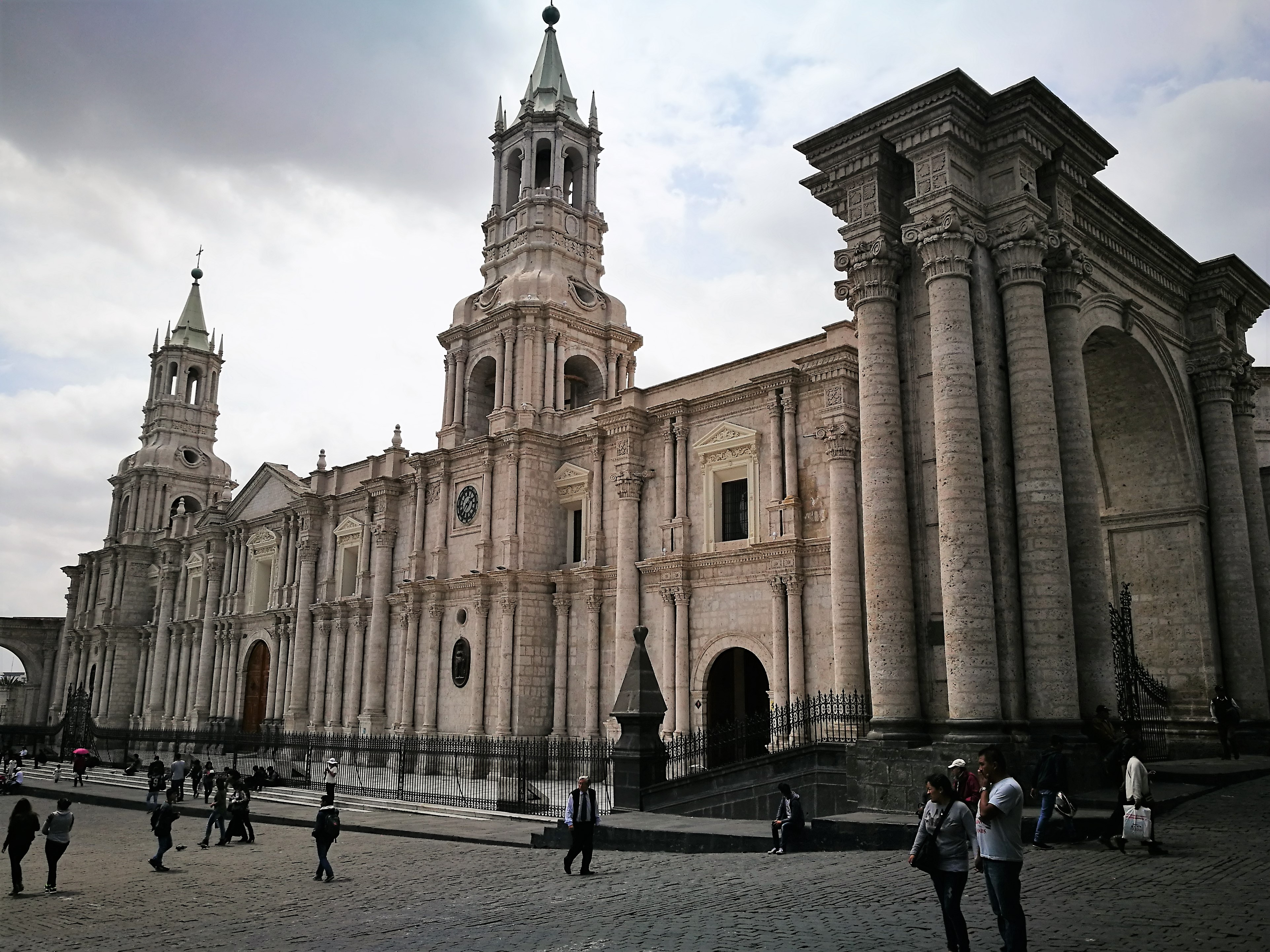
- Cathedral Basilica of St. Mary

Location
- Country: Peru

Statistics
- Area: 27,588 km^{2} (10,652 sq mi)
- Population: Total; Catholics: (as of 2022); 1,362,982; 1,203,688 (88.3%)
- Parishes: 77

Information
- Sui iuris church: Latin Church
- Rite: Roman Rite
- Established: 15 April 1577 (449 years ago)
- Cathedral: Catedral Basílica Santa María

Current leadership
- Pope: Leo XIV
- Archbishop: Javier Augusto Del Río Alba
- Auxiliary Bishops: Raúl Antonio Chau Quispe
- Bishops emeritus: José Paulino Ríos Reynoso

Map

Website
- www.arzobispadoarequipa.org.pe

The Archdiocese of Arequipa (Latin: Arequipensis) is a Latin Church archdiocese of the Catholic Church located in the city of Arequipa in Peru. It was erected by Pope Gregory XIII on 15 April 1577 at the request of King Philip II of Spain. The current Archbishop is Javier Augusto Del Río Alba since 21 October 2006.

== History ==
- 15 April 1577: Established as Diocese of Arequipa from the Metropolitan Archdiocese of Lima
- 20 July 1609: Erected for the second time by Pope Paul V
- 23 May 1943: Promoted as Metropolitan Archdiocese of Arequipa

== Ordinaries ==
=== Diocese of Arequipa ===
Erected: 15 April 1577
Latin Name: Arequipensis
Metropolitan: Archdiocese of Lima

- Antonio de Hervias, O.P. (15 Apr 1577 – 9 Jan 1579 Appointed, Bishop of Verapaz, Guatemala)
- Cristóbal Rodríguez Juárez (Juárez), O.P. (16 Jan 1612 – 4 Nov 1613 Died), Archbishop (personal title)
- Juan de las Cabezas Altamirano (16 Sep 1615 – 19 Dec 1615 Died)
- Pedro de Perea (Pérez Díaz), O.S.A. (4 Sep 1617 – 1631 Died)
- Pedro de Villagómez Vivanco (2 Aug 1632 – 16 Jul 1640 Appointed, Archbishop of Lima)
- Agustín de Ugarte y Sarabia (19 Nov 1640 – 21 Oct 1647 Appointed, Bishop of Quito, Ecuador)
- Pedro de Ortega y Sotomayor (26 Dec 1647 – 27 Nov 1651 Appointed, Bishop of Cuzco)
- Gaspar de Villarroel, O.S.A. (11 Dec 1651 – 27 Jan 1659 Appointed, Archbishop of La Plata o Charcas, Bolivia)
- Juan de Almoguera, O.SS.T. (17 Feb 1659 – 27 Nov 1673 Appointed, Archbishop of Lima)
- Juan de la Calle y Heredia, O. de M. (1 Oct 1674 – 15 Feb 1676 Died)
- Antonio de León y Becerra (14 Jun 1677 – 28 Aug 1708 Died)
- Juan de Argüelles, O.S.A. (21 Mar 1711 – 23 Jan 1712 Died)
- Juan Otálora Bravo de Lagunas (19 Nov 1714 – 1722 Died)
- Juan Cavero de Toledo (11 Jun 1725 – 20 Mar 1741 Died)
- Juan Bravo del Rivero y Correa (28 Jan 1743 – 22 May 1752 Died)
- Juan González Melgarejo (26 Nov 1753 – 6 Mar 1754 Died)
- Jacinto Aguado y Chacón (17 Feb 1755 – 18 Jul 1763 Appointed, Bishop of Osma, Spain)
- Diego Salguero de Cabrera (18 Jul 1763 – 2 Dec 1769 Died)
- Manuel de Abad e Illanar, O. Praem. (17 Jun 1771 – 1 Feb 1780 Died)
- Miguel de Pamplona González Bassecourt, O.F.M. Cap. (10 Dec 1781 – 10 Dec 1784 Resigned)
- Pedro José Chávez de la Rosa (18 Dec 1786 – 9 May 1805 Resigned)
- Luis La Encina Díaz y Pereiro (9 Sep 1805 – 16 Jan 1816 Died)
- José Sebastian Goyeneche y Barreda (14 Apr 1817 – 26 Sep 1859 Confirmed, Archbishop of Lima)
- Bartolomé Manuel Herrera Vélez (26 Sep 1859 – 10 Aug 1864 Died)
- Juan de la Cruz Calienes Olazabal, O.F.M. (27 Mar 1865 – 26 Jun 1867 Died)
- José Benedicto Torres Romero (22 Jun 1868 – 8 Jan 1880 Died)
- Juan María Ambrosio Huerta Galván (20 Aug 1880 – 27 Jun 1897 Died)
- Manuel Segundo Ballón Manrique (24 Aug 1898 – 1906 Resigned)
- Mariano Emilio Holguin y Maldonado, O.F.M. (1 Jun 1906 – 24 Dec 1945 Died)

=== Archdiocese of Arequipa ===
Elevated: 23 May 1943

- Leonardo José Rodriguez Ballón, O.F.M. (13 Jun 1946 – 26 Sep 1980 Resigned)
- Fernando Vargas Ruiz de Somocurcio, S.J. (26 Sep 1980 – 2 Mar 1996 Retired)
- Luis Sánchez-Moreno Lira (2 Mar 1996 – 29 Nov 2003 Retired)
- José Paulino Ríos Reynoso (29 Nov 2003 – 21 Oct 2006 Resigned)
- Javier Augusto Del Río Alba (21 Oct 2006 – )

== Other affiliated bishops ==
=== Coadjutor bishops ===
- Manuel Segundo Ballón Manrique (1896-1898)
- Javier Augusto Del Río Alba (2006)

=== Auxiliary bishops ===
- Juan Manuel Moscoso y Peralta (1770-1771), appointed Bishop of Córdoba (Tucumán), Argentina
- Giuseppe Luca Barranco, O. de M. (1866), never consecrated
- Daniel Figueroa Villón (1945-1946), appointed Bishop of Huancayo
- José Germán Benavides Morriberón (1968-1976)
- Lorenzo Unfried Gimpel, M.F.S.C. (1969-1980), appointed Prelate of Tarma
- Felipe María Zalba Elizalde, O.P. (1980-1984), appointed Prelate of Chuquibamba
- Raúl Antonio Chau Quispe (2019-)

=== Other priests of this diocese who became bishops ===
- Santiago José O' Phelan Recabarren, appointed Bishop of Ayacucho o Huamanga (Guamanga) in 1841
- Julián Ochoa Campos, appointed Bishop of Cuzco in 1864
- Pedro José Chávez Ponce, appointed Bishop of Puno in 1875
- Valentín Ampuero Núñez (priest here, 1894–1898), appointed Bishop of Puno in 1909
- Juan Gualberto Guevara y de la Cuba, appointed Bishop of Trujillo in 1940
- Pedro Alberto Bustamante López, appointed Prelate of Sicuani in 2013

== Suffragan dioceses ==
- Diocese of Puno
- Diocese of Tacna y Moquegua
- Territorial Prelature of Ayaviri
- Territorial Prelature of Chuquibamba
- Territorial Prelature of Juli
- Territorial Prelature of Santiago Apóstol de Huancané

== See also ==
- Roman Catholicism in Peru
