= Sancho Pardo Cárdenas y Figueroa =

Most Reverend Sancho Pardo Cárdenas y Figueroa
- Bishop of Panamá
- Church: Catholic Church
- Diocese: Diocese of Panamá
- In office: 1664–1671
- Predecessor: Diego López de Vergara y Aguilar
- Successor: Antonio de León y Becerra

Orders
- Consecration: May 17, 1665 by Pedro de Villagómez Vivanco

Personal details
- Died: January 1671 Panama City

Sancho Pardo Cárdenas y Figueroa (died January 1671) was a Roman Catholic prelate who served as Bishop of Panamá (1664–1671).

== Biography ==
On 24 March 1664, Sancho Pardo Cárdenas y Figueroa was appointed by the King of Spain and confirmed by Pope Urban VIII, as Bishop of Panamá. On May 17, 1665, he was consecrated bishop by Pedro de Villagómez Vivanco, Archbishop of Lima. He served as Bishop of Panamá until his death in January 1671.

== External links and additional sources ==
- Cheney, David M. "Archdiocese of Panamá". Catholic-Hierarchy.org. (for Chronology of Bishops) ^{[self-published]}
- Chow, Gabriel. "Metropolitan Archdiocese of Panamá". GCatholic.org. (for Chronology of Bishops) ^{[self-published]}

Religious titles
Preceded by Diego López de Vergara y Aguilar	Bishop of Panamá; 1664–1671	Succeeded by Antonio de León y Becerra
