= Luis Córdoba Ronquillo =

Bishop of Trujillo and Cartagena

Most Reverend Luis Córdoba Ronquillo
- Bishop of Trujillo
- Church: Catholic Church
- Diocese: Diocese of Cartagena in Colombia
- In office: 1630–1640
- Predecessor: Diego Montoya Mendoza
- Successor: Pedro de Ortega y Sotomayor
- Previous post: Bishop of Cartagena (1630–1640)

Orders
- Consecration: April 1631 by Bernardino de Almansa Carrión

Personal details
- Born: Granada, Spain
- Died: 24 November 1640 Trujillo, Peru

Luis Córdoba Ronquillo, O.SS.T. also Luis de Córdoba y Ronquillo (died 24 November 1640) was a Roman Catholic prelate who served as Bishop of Trujillo (1640) and Bishop of Cartagena in Colombia (1630–1640).

== Biography ==
Luis Córdoba Ronquillo was born in Granada, Spain and ordained a priest in the Order of the Most Holy Trinity and of the Captives. On 9 September 1630, he was appointed during the papacy of Pope Urban VIII as Bishop of Cartagena in Colombia. In April 1631, he was consecrated bishop by Bernardino de Almansa Carrión, Archbishop of Santo Domingo, with Luis Camargo Pacheco, Titular Bishop of Centuria, and Alonso Godina, Titular Bishop of Utica, serving as co-consecrators. On 14 April 1640, he was selected by the King of Spain as Bishop of Trujillo and confirmed by Pope Urban VIII on 13 August 1640. He served as Bishop of Trujillo until his death on 24 November 1640.

While bishop, he was the principal consecrator of Agustín de Ugarte y Sarabia, Bishop of Chiapas (1631); and Cristóbal de Torres, Archbishop of Santafé en Nueva Granada (1635).

== External links and additional sources ==
- Cheney, David M. "Archdiocese of Trujillo". Catholic-Hierarchy.org. (for Chronology of Bishops) ^{[self-published]}
- Chow, Gabriel. "Metropolitan Archdiocese of Trujillo (Peru)". GCatholic.org. (for Chronology of Bishops) ^{[self-published]}
- Cheney, David M. "Archdiocese of Cartagena". Catholic-Hierarchy.org. (for Chronology of Bishops) ^{[self-published]}
- Chow, Gabriel. "Metropolitan Archdiocese of Cartagena". GCatholic.org. (for Chronology of Bishops) ^{[self-published]}

Catholic Church titles
Preceded by Diego Ramirez de Cepeda	Bishop of Cartagena in Colombia; 1630–1640	Succeeded by Cristóbal Pérez Lazarraga y Maneli Viana
Preceded by Diego Montoya Mendoza	Bishop of Trujillo; 1640	Succeeded by Pedro de Ortega y Sotomayor
