= Bernardo de Izaguirre de los Reyes =

Spanish Roman Catholic prelate

Most Reverend Bernardo de Izaguirre de los Reyes
- Archbishop of La Plata o Charcas
- Church: Catholic Church
- Archdiocese: Archdiocese of La Plata o Charcas
- Predecessor: Gaspar de Villarroel
- Successor: Melchor Liñán y Cisneros
- Previous posts: Bishop of Cuzco (1662–1669); Bishop of Panamá (1654–1659)

Orders
- Consecration: February 9, 1642 by Alonso de Briceño

Personal details
- Born: Toledo, Spain
- Died: November 16, 1668 Caracas

Bernardo de Izaguirre de los Reyes (died November 16, 1668) was a Roman Catholic prelate who served as Archbishop of La Plata o Charcas (1669–1670), Bishop of Cuzco (1662–1669), and Bishop of Panamá (1654–1659).

== Biography ==
Bernardo de Izaguirre de los Reyes was born in Toledo, Spain. He was selected on July 28, 1654, and confirmed on April 21, 1655, by Pope Alexander VII as Bishop of Panamá. On January 12, 1659, he was consecrated bishop by Alonso de Briceño, Bishop of Caracas On July 31, 1662, he was appointed as Bishop of Cuzco. On July 15, 1669, Pope Clement IX confirmed him as Archbishop of La Plata o Charcas. He served as Archbishop of La Plata o Charcas until his death on November 16, 1668.

While bishop, he was the principal consecrator of Gabriel de Guilléstegui, Bishop of Paraguay.

== External links and additional sources ==
- Cheney, David M. "Archdiocese of Sucre". Catholic-Hierarchy.org. (for Chronology of Bishops) ^{[self-published]}
- Chow, Gabriel. "Metropolitan Archdiocese of Sucre (Bolivia)". GCatholic.org. (for Chronology of Bishops) ^{[self-published]}
- Cheney, David M. "Archdiocese of Panamá". Catholic-Hierarchy.org. (for Chronology of Bishops) ^{[self-published]}
- Chow, Gabriel. "Metropolitan Archdiocese of Panamá". GCatholic.org. (for Chronology of Bishops) ^{[self-published]}
- Cheney, David M. "Archdiocese of Cuzco". Catholic-Hierarchy.org. (for Chronology of Bishops) ^{[self-published]}
- Chow, Gabriel. "Metropolitan Archdiocese of Cusco (Peru)". GCatholic.org. (for Chronology of Bishops) ^{[self-published]}

Religious titles
Preceded by Hernando de Ramírez y Sánchez	Bishop of Panamá; 1654–1659	Succeeded by Diego López de Vergara y Aguilar; Bishop-Elect
Preceded by Agustín Muñoz Sandoval	Bishop of Cuzco; 1662–1669	Succeeded by Manuel de Mollinedo Angulo
Preceded by Gaspar de Villarroel	Archbishop of La Plata o Charcas; 1669–1670	Succeeded by Melchor Liñán y Cisneros
