= Juan de la Calle y Heredia =

Spanish Roman Catholic prelate

Most Reverend Juan de la Calle y Heredia
- Bishop of Arequipa
- Church: Catholic Church
- Diocese: Diocese of Arequipa
- In office: 1674–1676
- Predecessor: Juan de Almoguera
- Successor: Antonio de León y Becerra
- Previous post: Bishop of Trujillo (1661–1674)

Orders
- Consecration: 22 Oct 1662 by Pedro de Villagómez Vivanco

Personal details
- Born: 1612 Granada, Spain
- Died: 15 Feb 1676 (age 64) Arequipa, Peru

Juan de la Calle y Heredia (1612 – 15 Feb 1676) was a Roman Catholic prelate who served as Bishop of Arequipa (1674–1676), Bishop of Trujillo (1661–1674).

== Biography ==
Juan de la Calle y Heredia was born in Granada, Spain in 1612 and ordained a friar in the Order of Our Lady of Mercy. On 5 Sep 1661, he was appointed during the papacy of Pope Alexander VII as Bishop of Trujillo. On 22 Oct 1662, he was consecrated bishop by Pedro de Villagómez Vivanco, Archbishop of Lima. On 1 Oct 1674, he was appointed during the papacy of Pope Clement X as Bishop of Arequipa. He served as Bishop of Arequipa until his death on 15 Feb 1676.

== External links and additional sources ==
- Cheney, David M. "Archdiocese of Arequipa". Catholic-Hierarchy.org. (for Chronology of Bishops) ^{[self-published]}
- Chow, Gabriel. "Metropolitan Archdiocese of Arequipa". GCatholic.org. (for Chronology of Bishops) ^{[self-published]}

Catholic Church titles
Preceded by Francisco de Godoy	Bishop of Trujillo; 1661–1674	Succeeded by Alvarus de Ibarra
Preceded by Juan de Almoguera	Bishop of Arequipa; 1674–1676	Succeeded by Antonio de León y Becerra
