= Alfonso Santillán Fajardo =

Most Reverend Alfonso Santillán Fajardo
- Bishop of Quito
- Church: Catholic Church
- Diocese: Diocese of Quito
- In office: 1616–1620
- Predecessor: Hernando de Arias y Ugarte
- Successor: Francisco Sotomayor

Personal details
- Died: 15 October 1620 Quito, Ecuador

Alfonso Santillán Fajardo, O.P. (died 15 Oct 1620) was a Roman Catholic prelate who served as Bishop of Quito (1616–1620).

== Biography ==
Alfonso Santillán Fajardo was ordained a priest in the Order of Preachers. On 23 Mar 1616, he was appointed during the papacy of Pope Paul V as Bishop of Quito. He served as Bishop of Quito until his death on 15 Oct 1620.

== External links and additional sources ==
- Chow, Gabriel. "Metropolitan Archdiocese of Concepción (Chile)". GCatholic.org. (for Chronology of Bishops) ^{[self-published]}
- Cheney, David M. "Archdiocese of Quito". Catholic-Hierarchy.org. (for Chronology of Bishops) ^{[self-published]}

Catholic Church titles
Preceded by Hernando de Arias y Ugarte	Bishop of Quito; 1616–1620	Succeeded by Francisco Sotomayor
