= Diego de Humansoro Carantía =

Most Reverend Diego de Humansoro Carantía
- Church: Catholic Church
- Diocese: Diocese of Santiago de Chile
- In office: 1660–1676
- Predecessor: Diego de Zambrana de Villalobos y Cordero
- Successor: Bernardo de Carrasco y Saavedra

Orders
- Consecration: 15 May 1662

Personal details
- Born: Nov 1601 Azcoitia, Spain
- Died: 29 May 1676 (age 74) Santiago de Chile

Diego de Humansoro Carantía, O.F.M. (1601–1676) was a Roman Catholic prelate who served as Bishop of Santiago de Chile (1660–1676).

== Biography ==
Diego de Humansoro Carantía was born in Azcoitia, Spain in Nov 1601 and ordained a priest in the Order of Friars Minor. On 26 Jan 1660, he was appointed during the papacy of Pope Alexander VII as Bishop of Santiago de Chile. On 15 May 1662, he was consecrated bishop by Pedro de Villagómez Vivanco, Archbishop of Lima; and installed on 5 Jul 1662. He served as Bishop of Santiago de Chile until his death on 29 May 1676.

Catholic Church titles
Preceded by Diego de Zambrana de Villalobos y Cordero	Bishop of Santiago de Chile; 1660–1676	Succeeded by Bernardo de Carrasco y Saavedra
