= Antonio de León y Becerra =

Spanish Roman Catholic prelate

Most Reverend Antonio de León y Becerra
- Bishop of Arequipa
- Church: Catholic Church
- Diocese: Diocese of Arequipa
- In office: 1677–1708
- Predecessor: Juan de la Calle y Heredia
- Successor: Juan de Argüelles

Orders
- Ordination: 1657
- Consecration: July 29, 1673 by Antonio Sanz Lozano

Personal details
- Born: 1631 Madrid, Spain
- Died: August 28, 1708 (age 77) Arequipa, Peru

Antonio de León y Becerra (1631 – August 28, 1708) was a Roman Catholic prelate who served as the Bishop of Arequipa (1677–1708), the Bishop of Trujillo (1676–1677), and the Bishop of Panamá (1672–1676).

== Biography ==
Antonio de León y Becerra was born in Madrid, Spain and ordained a priest in 1657. On March 21, 1672, he was appointed by the King of Spain and confirmed by Pope Clement X as Bishop of Panamá. On July 29, 1673, he was consecrated bishop by Antonio Sanz Lozano, Bishop of Cartagena. On March 31, 1676, he was appointed by the King of Spain and confirmed October 19, 1676 by Pope Innocent XI as Bishop of Trujillo. On June 14, 1677, he was appointed by the King of Spain and confirmed by Pope Innocent XI as Bishop of Arequipa. He served as Bishop of Arequipa until his death on August 28, 1708.

== External links and additional sources ==
- Cheney, David M. "Archdiocese of Panamá". Catholic-Hierarchy.org. (for Chronology of Bishops) ^{[self-published]}
- Chow, Gabriel. "Metropolitan Archdiocese of Panamá". GCatholic.org. (for Chronology of Bishops) ^{[self-published]}
- Cheney, David M. "Archdiocese of Arequipa". Catholic-Hierarchy.org. (for Chronology of Bishops) ^{[self-published]}
- Chow, Gabriel. "Metropolitan Archdiocese of Arequipa". GCatholic.org. (for Chronology of Bishops) ^{[self-published]}

Religious titles
| Preceded by Sancho Pardo Cárdenas y Figueroa | Bishop of Panamá; 1672–1676 | Succeeded by Lucas Fernández de Piedrahita |
| Preceded by Alvarus de Ibarra | Bishop of Trujillo; 1676–1677 | Succeeded by Francisco de Borja |
| Preceded by Juan de la Calle y Heredia | Bishop of Arequipa; 1677–1708 | Succeeded by Juan de Argüelles |
