= Bernardino de Almansa Carrión =

The Most Reverend Bernardino de Almansa Carrión
- Archbishop (personal title) of Cuzco
- Church: Catholic Church
- Diocese: Diocese of Cuzco
- In office: 1631–1633
- Predecessor: Julián de Cortázar
- Successor: Cristóbal de Torres
- Previous post: Archbishop of Santo Domingo (1629–1631)

Personal details
- Born: July 6, 1579 Lima, Peru
- Died: September 26, 1633 (age 54) Bogotá, Colombia

Bernardino de Almansa Carrión (July 6, 1579 – September 26, 1633) was a Roman Catholic prelate who served as the Archbishop of Santafé en Nueva Granada (1631–1633) and Archbishop of Santo Domingo (1629–1631).

== Biography ==
Bernardino de Almansa Carrión was born in Lima, Peru. On September 17, 1629, he was appointed by the King of Spain and confirmed by Urban VIII as Archbishop of Santo Domingo. In December 1619, he was consecrated bishop by Juan Bravo Lagunas, Bishop of Ugento. On November 13, 1628, he was selected by the King of Spain and confirmed by Pope Urban VIII as Archbishop of Santafé en Nueva Granada. He served as Archbishop of Santafé en Nueva Granada until his death on September 26, 1633. While bishop, he was the principal Consecrator of Luis Córdoba Ronquillo, Bishop of Cartagena.

== External links and additional sources ==
- Cheney, David M. "Archdiocese of Santo Domingo". Catholic-Hierarchy.org. (for Chronology of Bishops) ^{[self-published]}
- Chow, Gabriel. "Metropolitan Archdiocese of Santo Domingo". GCatholic.org. (for Chronology of Bishops) ^{[self-published]}
- Cheney, David M. "Archdiocese of Bogotá". Catholic-Hierarchy.org. (for Chronology of Bishops) ^{[self-published]}
- Chow, Gabriel. "Metropolitan Archdiocese of Bogotá (Colombia)". GCatholic.org. (for Chronology of Bishops) ^{[self-published]}

Religious titles
Preceded by Fernando de Vera y Zuñiga	Archbishop of Santo Domingo; 1629–1631	Succeeded by Facundo de la Torre
Preceded by Julián de Cortázar	Archbishop of Santafé en Nueva Granada; 1631–1633	Succeeded by Cristóbal de Torres
