= Pedro de Oviedo Falconi =

Most Reverend Pedro de Oviedo Falconi
- Archbishop of La Plata o Charcas
- Church: Catholic Church
- Archdiocese: Archdiocese of La Plata o Charcas
- In office: 1645–1649
- Predecessor: Francisco Vega Borja
- Successor: Juan Alonso y Ocón
- Previous posts: Archbishop of Quito (1628–1645); Archbishop of Santo Domingo (1621–1628)

Orders
- Consecration: by Gonzalo de Angulo

Personal details
- Born: Alcalá de Henares, Spain
- Died: 13 October 1649 Sucre, Bolivia

Pedro de Oviedo Falconi (died 13 October 1649) was a Roman Catholic prelate who served as the Archbishop of La Plata o Charcas (1645–1649), Archbishop of Quito (1628–1645), and Archbishop of Santo Domingo (1621–1628).

== Biography ==
Pedro de Oviedo Falconi was born in Alcalá de Henares, Spain and ordained a priest in the Cistercian Order. On 11 January 1621 he was appointed by the King of Spain and confirmed by Pope Urban VIII as Archbishop of Santo Domingo. He was consecrated bishop by Gonzalo de Angulo, Bishop of Coro. On 14 May 1628 he was appointed by the King of Spain and confirmed by Pope Urban VIII, on 10 July 1628, as Archbishop (personal title) of the Diocese of Quito. On 14 June 1645 he was appointed by the King of Spain and confirmed by Pope Innocent X on 21 August 1645 as Archbishop of La Plata o Charcas. He served as Archbishop of La Plata o Charcas until his death on 13 October 1649.

While bishop, he was the principal Consecrator of Bernardo de Valbuena y Villanueva, Bishop of Puerto Rico and Diego Montoya Mendoza, Bishop of Popayán.

== External links and additional sources ==
- Cheney, David M. "Archdiocese of Santo Domingo". Catholic-Hierarchy.org. (for Chronology of Bishops) ^{[self-published]}
- Chow, Gabriel. "Metropolitan Archdiocese of Santo Domingo". GCatholic.org. (for Chronology of Bishops) ^{[self-published]}
- Chow, Gabriel. "Metropolitan Archdiocese of Concepción (Chile)". GCatholic.org. (for Chronology of Bishops) ^{[self-published]}
- Cheney, David M. "Archdiocese of Quito". Catholic-Hierarchy.org. (for Chronology of Bishops) ^{[self-published]}
- Cheney, David M. "Archdiocese of Sucre". Catholic-Hierarchy.org. (for Chronology of Bishops) ^{[self-published]}
- Chow, Gabriel. "Metropolitan Archdiocese of Sucre (Bolivia)". GCatholic.org. (for Chronology of Bishops) ^{[self-published]}

Religious titles
Preceded by Pedro de Solier y Vargas	Archbishop of Santo Domingo; 1621–1628	Succeeded by Fernando de Vera y Zuñiga
Preceded by Francisco Sotomayor	Archbishop (personal title) of Quito; 1628–1645	Succeeded by Agustín de Ugarte y Sarabia
Preceded by Francisco Vega Borja	Archbishop of La Plata o Charcas; 1645–1649	Succeeded by Juan Alonso y Ocón
