= Juan de Argüelles =

Roman Catholic prelate

Most Reverend Juan de Argüelles
- Bishop of Arequipa
- Church: Catholic Church
- Diocese: Diocese of Arequipa
- In office: 1711–1712
- Predecessor: Antonio de León y Becerra
- Successor: Juan Otálora Bravo de Lagunas
- Previous post: Bishop of Panamá (1699–1711)

Orders
- Consecration: 1701 by Pedro Díaz de Cienfuegos

Personal details
- Born: 1659 Lima, Peru
- Died: January 23, 1712 (age 53) Arequipa

Juan de Argüelles (1659 – January 23, 1712) was a Roman Catholic prelate who served as the Bishop of Arequipa (1711–1712) and the Bishop of Panamá (1699–1711).

== Biography ==
Juan de Argüelles was born in Lima, Peru and ordained a priest in the Order of Saint Augustine. On May 18, 1699, he was appointed by the King of Spain and confirmed by Pope Innocent XII as Bishop of Panamá. In 1701, he was consecrated bishop by Pedro Díaz de Cienfuegos, Bishop of Trujillo. On March 21, 1711, he was appointed by the King of Spain and confirmed by Pope Clement XI as Bishop of Arequipa. He served as Bishop of Arequipa until his death on January 23, 1712.

While bishop, he was the principal Consecrator of Diego Morcillo Rubio de Suñón de Robledo, Bishop of Nicaragua.

== See also ==
- Catholic Church in Peru

== External links and additional sources ==
- Cheney, David M. "Archdiocese of Panamá". Catholic-Hierarchy.org. (for Chronology of Bishops) ^{[self-published]}
- Chow, Gabriel. "Metropolitan Archdiocese of Panamá". GCatholic.org. (for Chronology of Bishops) ^{[self-published]}
- Cheney, David M. "Archdiocese of Arequipa". Catholic-Hierarchy.org. (for Chronology of Bishops) ^{[self-published]}
- Chow, Gabriel. "Metropolitan Archdiocese of Arequipa". GCatholic.org. (for Chronology of Bishops) ^{[self-published]}

Catholic Church titles
Preceded by Diego Ladrón de Guevara	Bishop of Panamá; 1699–1711	Succeeded by Juan José Llamas Rivas
Preceded by Antonio de León y Becerra	Bishop of Arequipa; 1711–1712	Succeeded by Juan Otálora Bravo de Lagunas
