= Gonzalo del Campo =

Most Reverend Gonzalo del Campo
- Archbishop of Lima
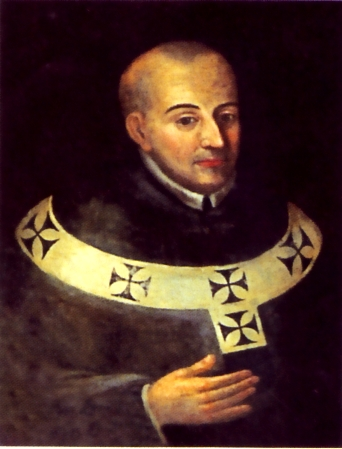
- Church: Catholic Church
- Diocese: Archbishop of Lima
- In office: 1625–1627
- Predecessor: Bartolomé Lobo Guerrero
- Successor: Hernando de Arias y Ugarte

Orders
- Consecration: March 10, 1624 by Luis Fernández de Córdoba

Personal details
- Born: Ronda Spain
- Died: October 15, 1627

Gonzalo del Campo or Lopez de Ocampo (Died October 15, 1627) was a Roman Catholic prelate who served as Archbishop of Lima (1625–1627).

== Biography ==
On October 2, 1623, Pope Urban VIII, appointed Gonzalo del Campo, the fifth Archbishop of Lima. On March 10, 1624, he was consecrated bishop by Luis Fernández de Córdoba, Archbishop of Santiago de Compostela and installed August 20, 1625. He served as Archbishop of Lima until his death on October 15, 1627.

While bishop, he was the principal Consecrator of Francisco Sotomayor, Bishop of Cartagena.

== See also ==
- Catholic Church in Peru

== External links and additional sources ==
- Cheney, David M. "Archdiocese of Lima". Catholic-Hierarchy.org. (for Chronology of Bishops) ^{[self-published]}
- Chow, Gabriel. "Metropolitan Archdiocese of Lima (Peru)". GCatholic.org. (for Chronology of Bishops) ^{[self-published]}
- Don Gonzalo del Campo. Canónigo de Sevilla y Arzobispo de Lima. Por Patiño Castañeda Delgado. Universidad Internacional de Andalucía.

Religious titles
Preceded by Bartolomé Lobo Guerrero	Archbishop of Lima; 1607–1622	Succeeded by Hernando de Arias y Ugarte
