= Diocese of Tulcán =

Roman Catholic diocese in Ecuador

Coordinates: 0°48′42″N 77°43′7″W

Diocese of Tulcán Dioecesis Tulcanensis

Catholic

Location
- Country: Ecuador
- Ecclesiastical province: Quito

Statistics
- Area: 3,699 km^{2} (1,428 sq mi)
- Population: Total; Catholics: (as of 2010); 184,000; 176,000 (95.7%)
- Parishes: 25

Information
- Denomination: Roman Catholic
- Rite: Latin Rite
- Established: 17 March 1965

Current leadership
- Pope: Leo XIV
- Bishop: Carlos Washington Yépez Naranjo

Map
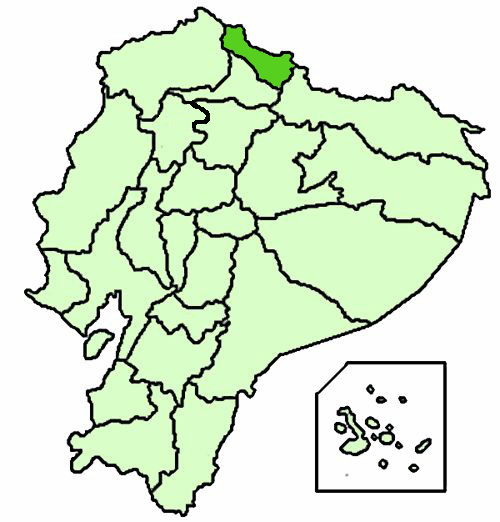

The Roman Catholic Diocese of Tulcán (Latin: Dioecesis Tulcanensis) is a diocese located in the city of Tulcán in the ecclesiastical province of Quito in Ecuador.

== Ordinaries ==
- Luis Clemente de la Vega Rodriguez (17 Mar 1965 – 4 May 1987)
- Germán Trajano Pavón Puente (28 Jan 1989 – 19 Apr 2001), appointed Bishop of Ambato
- Luis Antonio Sánchez Armijos, S.D.B. (15 Jun 2002 – 22 Feb 2010), appointed Bishop of Machala
- Fausto Gaibor García (4 May 2011 – 4 Jun 2021)
- Luis Bernardino Núñez Villacís (5 Jul 2021 – 6 Aug 2021; did not take effect)
- Carlos Washington Yépez Naranjo (16 May 2023 – present)

== Sources ==
- GCatholic.org
- Catholic Hierarchy
