= Fernando de Vera y Zuñiga =

Spanish Roman Catholic prelate

Most Reverend Fernando de Vera y Zuñiga
- Archbishop (personal title) of Cuzco
- Church: Catholic Church
- Diocese: Diocese of Cuzco
- In office: 1629–1638
- Predecessor: Lorenzo Pérez de Grado
- Successor: Diego Montoya Mendoza
- Previous posts: Auxiliary Bishop of Badajoz (1614–1628); Archbishop of Santo Domingo (1628–1629)

Personal details
- Born: 1568 Mérida, Spain
- Died: November 9, 1638 (age 70) Cuzco, Peru

Fernando de Vera y Zuñiga (1558 – November 9, 1638) was a Roman Catholic prelate who served as the Archbishop of Cuzco (1629–1638), Archbishop of Santo Domingo (1628–1629), and Auxiliary Bishop of Badajoz (1614–1628).

== Biography ==
Fernando de Vera y Zuñiga was born in Mérida, Spain in 1568 and ordained a priest in the Order of Saint Augustine. On February 17, 1614, he was appointed by Pope Paul V as Auxiliary Bishop of Badajoz in Spain and Titular Bishop of Bugi. On November 13, 1628, he was appointed by the King of Spain and confirmed by Pope Urban VIII as Archbishop of the Archbishop of Santo Domingo. On March 8, 1629, he was appointed by the King of Spain and confirmed by Pope Urban VIII as Archbishop (personal title) of the Diocese of Cuzco. He served as Archbishop of Cuzco until his death on November 9, 1638.

While bishop, he was the principal Consecrator of Francisco Vega Borja, Archbishop of La Plata o Charcas.

== External links and additional sources ==
- Cheney, David M. "Archdiocese of Santo Domingo". Catholic-Hierarchy.org. (for Chronology of Bishops) ^{[self-published]}
- Chow, Gabriel. "Metropolitan Archdiocese of Santo Domingo". GCatholic.org. (for Chronology of Bishops) ^{[self-published]}
- Cheney, David M. "Archdiocese of Cuzco". Catholic-Hierarchy.org. (for Chronology of Bishops) ^{[self-published]}
- Chow, Gabriel. "Metropolitan Archdiocese of Cusco (Peru)". GCatholic.org. (for Chronology of Bishops) ^{[self-published]}

Catholic Church titles
Preceded by Pedro de Oviedo Falconi	Archbishop of Santo Domingo; 1628–1629	Succeeded by Bernardino de Almansa Carrión
Preceded by Lorenzo Pérez de Grado	Archbishop (personal title) of Cuzco; 1629–1638	Succeeded by Diego Montoya Mendoza
