= Sancho de Andrade de Figueroa =

Spanish Roman Catholic prelate

Most Reverend Sancho de Andrade de Figueroa
- Bishop of Quito
- Church: Catholic Church
- Diocese: Diocese of Quito
- In office: 1688–1702
- Predecessor: Alfonso de la Peña y Montenegro
- Successor: Diego Ladrón de Guevara
- Previous post: Bishop of Ayacucho o Huamanga (1679–1688)

Orders
- Ordination: 1661
- Consecration: 14 April 1680 by Lucas Fernández de Piedrahita

Personal details
- Born: 1632 Santiago de Compostela, Kingdom of Galicia, Crown of Castile
- Died: 1702 (age 70) Quito, Royal Audiencia of Quito, Viceroyalty of Peru, Spanish Empire

Sancho de Andrade de Figueroa (1632–1702) was a Roman Catholic prelate who served as Bishop of Quito (1688–1702) and Bishop of Ayacucho o Huamanga (1679–1688).

== Biography ==
Sancho de Andrade de Figueroa was born in Santiago de Compostela, Spain in 1632 and ordained a priest in 1661. On 12 June 1679, he was appointed during the papacy of Pope Innocent XI as Bishop of Ayacucho o Huamanga. On 14 April 1680, he was consecrated bishop by Lucas Fernández de Piedrahita, Bishop of Panamá. On 15 November 1688, he was appointed during the papacy of Pope Innocent XI as Bishop of Quito. He served as Bishop of Quito until his death in 1702.

While bishop, he was the principal consecrator of Martín de Híjar y Mendoza, Bishop of Concepción (1694).

== External links and additional sources ==
- Cheney, David M. "Archdiocese of Ayacucho". Catholic-Hierarchy.org. (for Chronology of Bishops)^{self-published}
- Chow, Gabriel. "Metropolitan Archdiocese of Ayacucho". GCatholic.org. (for Chronology of Bishops)^{self-published}
- Chow, Gabriel. "Metropolitan Archdiocese of Concepción (Chile)". GCatholic.org. (for Chronology of Bishops) ^{[self-published]}
- Cheney, David M. "Archdiocese of Quito". Catholic-Hierarchy.org. (for Chronology of Bishops) ^{[self-published]}

Catholic Church titles
Preceded by Cristóbal de Castilla y Zamora	Bishop of Ayacucho o Huamanga; 1679–1688	Succeeded by Francisco Luis de Bruna Rico
Preceded by Alfonso de la Peña y Montenegro	Bishop of Quito; 1688–1702	Succeeded by Diego Ladrón de Guevara
