= Diego López de Vergara y Aguilar =

Most Reverend Diego López de Vergara y Aguilar
- Bishop-Elect of Panamá
- Church: Catholic Church
- Diocese: Diocese of Panamá
- In office: 1662
- Predecessor: Bernardo de Izaguirre de los Reyes
- Successor: Sancho Pardo Cárdenas y Figueroa

Personal details
- Died: 1662

Diego López de Vergara y Aguilar (died 1662) was a Roman Catholic prelate who served as Bishop-Elect of Panamá (1662).

== Biography ==
On 8 August 1662, he was appointed during the papacy of Pope Alexander VII as Bishop of Panamá. It is uncertain if he ever took possession of the see; he died in 1662 before he was consecrated.

== External links and additional sources ==
- Cheney, David M. "Archdiocese of Panamá". Catholic-Hierarchy.org. (for Chronology of Bishops) ^{[self-published]}
- Chow, Gabriel. "Metropolitan Archdiocese of Panamá". GCatholic.org. (for Chronology of Bishops) ^{[self-published]}

Catholic Church titles
Preceded by Bernardo de Izaguirre de los Reyes	Bishop-Elect of Panamá; 1662	Succeeded by Sancho Pardo Cárdenas y Figueroa
