= Gabriel de Guilléstegui =

Spanish prelate

Most Reverend Gabriel de Guilléstegui
- Bishop of La Paz
- Church: Catholic Church
- Diocese: Diocese of La Paz
- In office: 1670–1677
- Predecessor: Martín de Montalvo Calderon de la Barca
- Successor: Juan Pérez de Corcha
- Previous post: Bishop of Paraguay (1666–1670)

Orders
- Consecration: 1667 by Bernardo de Izaguirre de los Reyes

Personal details
- Born: 1594 Toledo, Spain
- Died: 1677 (aged 82–83)

Gabriel de Guilléstegui, O.F.M. (1594–1677) was a Roman Catholic prelate who served as Bishop of La Paz (1670–1677) and Bishop of Paraguay (1666–1670).

== Biography ==
Gabriel de Guilléstegui was born in Toledo, Spain in 1594 and ordained a priest in the Order of Friars Minor. On 15 December 1666, he was appointed during the papacy of Pope Alexander VII as Bishop of Paraguay. In 1667, he was consecrated bishop by Bernardo de Izaguirre de los Reyes, Bishop of Cuzco. On 1 September 1670, he was appointed during the papacy of Pope Clement X as Bishop of La Paz. He served as Bishop of La Paz' until his death in 1677.

While bishop, he was the principal consecrator of Francisco de Borja, Bishop of Córdoba (1671).

== External links and additional sources ==
- Cheney, David M. "Archdiocese of Asunción". Catholic-Hierarchy.org. (for Chronology of Bishops) ^{[self-published]}
- Chow, Gabriel. "Metropolitan Archdiocese of Asunción (Paraguay)". GCatholic.org. (for Chronology of Bishops) ^{[self-published]}
- Cheney, David M. "Archdiocese of La Paz". Catholic-Hierarchy.org. (for Chronology of Bishops) ^{[self-published]}
- Chow, Gabriel. "Metropolitan Archdiocese of La Paz (Bolivia)". GCatholic.org. (for Chronology of Bishops) ^{[self-published]}

Catholic Church titles
Preceded by Bernardino de Cárdenas Ponce	Bishop of Paraguay; 1666–1670	Succeeded by Ferdinandus de Valcácer
Preceded by Martín de Montalvo Calderon de la Barca	Bishop of La Paz; 1670–1677	Succeeded by Juan Pérez de Corcha
