= Gaspar de Villarroel =

Ecuadorian Roman Catholic prelate

Most Reverend Gaspar de Villarroel
- Archbishop of La Plata o Charcas
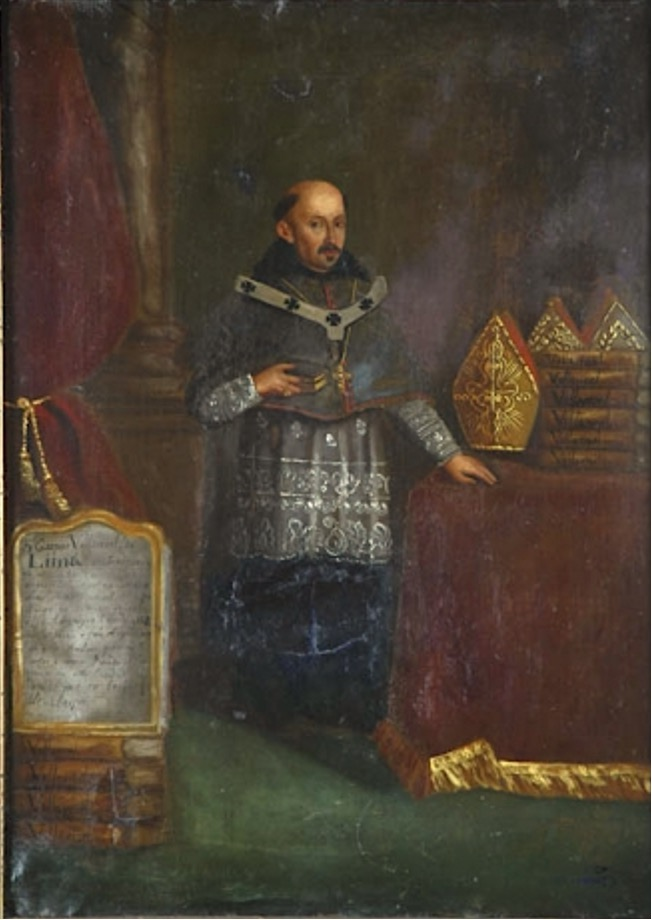
- Church: Catholic Church
- Diocese: Archdiocese of La Plata o Charcas
- In office: 1659–1665
- Predecessor: Juan Alonso y Ocón
- Successor: Bernardo de Izaguirre de los Reyes
- Previous posts: Bishop of Santiago de Chile (1637–1651); Bishop of Arequipa (1651–1659)

Orders
- Consecration: 2 May 1638 by Francisco de la Serna

Personal details
- Born: 1587 Quito, Ecuador
- Died: 15 October 1665 (aged 77–78)

Gaspar de Villarroel, O.S.A. (1587 – 15 October 1665) was a Roman Catholic prelate who served as Archbishop of La Plata o Charcas (1659–1665), Bishop of Arequipa (1651–1659), and Bishop of Santiago de Chile (1637–1651).

== Biography ==
Luis Córdoba Ronquillo was born in Quito and ordained a priest in the Order of Saint Augustine. On 20 April 1637, he was appointed during the papacy of Pope Urban VIII as Bishop of Santiago de Chile. On 2 May 1638, he was consecrated bishop by Francisco de la Serna, Bishop of Popayán, with Father Pedro de Ortega y Sotomayor assisting. On 11 December 1651, he was appointed during the papacy of Pope Innocent X as Bishop of Arequipa. On January 1659, he was appointed during the papacy of Pope Alexander VII as Archbishop of La Plata o Charcas and installed in 1660. He served as Archbishop of La Plata o Charcas until his death on 15 October 1665.

== External links and additional sources ==
- Cheney, David M. "Archdiocese of Arequipa". Catholic-Hierarchy.org. (for Chronology of Bishops) ^{[self-published]}
- Chow, Gabriel. "Metropolitan Archdiocese of Arequipa". GCatholic.org. (for Chronology of Bishops) ^{[self-published]}
- Cheney, David M. "Archdiocese of Sucre". Catholic-Hierarchy.org. (for Chronology of Bishops) ^{[self-published]}
- Chow, Gabriel. "Metropolitan Archdiocese of Sucre (Bolivia)". GCatholic.org. (for Chronology of Bishops) ^{[self-published]}

Catholic Church titles
Preceded by Francisco González de Salcedo Castro	Bishop of Santiago de Chile; 1637–1651	Succeeded by Diego de Zambrana de Villalobos y Cordero
Preceded by Pedro de Ortega y Sotomayor	Bishop of Arequipa; 1651–1659	Succeeded by Juan de Almoguera
Preceded by Juan Alonso y Ocón	Archbishop of La Plata o Charcas; 1659–1665	Succeeded by Bernardo de Izaguirre de los Reyes
