= Alfonso de la Peña y Montenegro =

Spanish Roman Catholic prelate

Most Reverend Pedro de la Peña y Montenegro
- Bishop of Quito
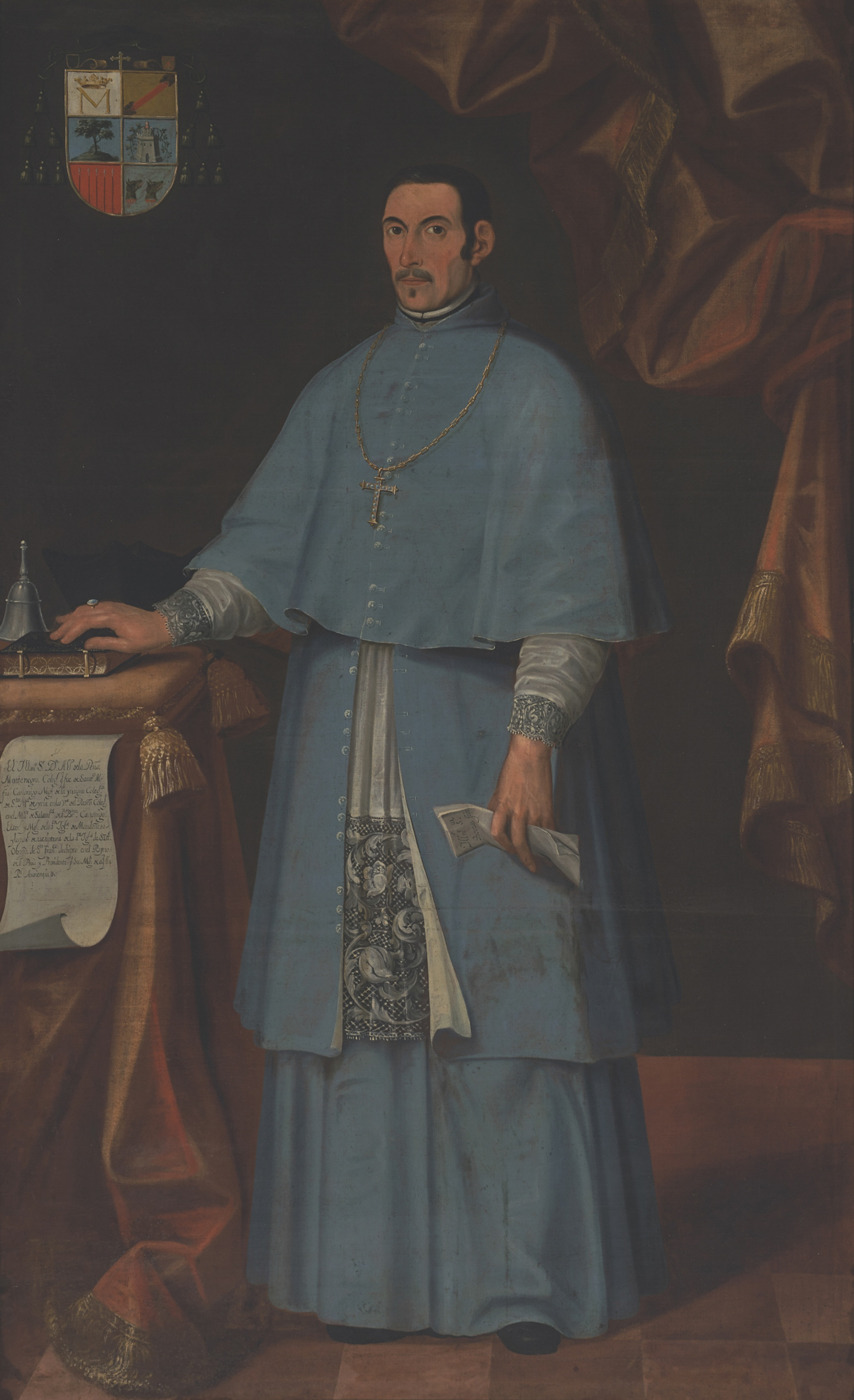
- Church: Catholic Church
- Diocese: Diocese of Quito
- In office: 1653–1687
- Predecessor: Agustín de Ugarte y Sarabia
- Successor: Sancho de Andrade de Figueroa

Orders
- Consecration: April 1654 by Cristóbal de Torres, O.P.

Personal details
- Born: 29 April 1596 Padrón, Kingdom of Galicia, Crown of Castile
- Died: 1687 (age 90) Quito, Royal Audiencia of Quito, Viceroyalty of Peru, Spanish Empire

Alfonso de la Peña y Montenegro (29 Apr 1596 – 1687) was a Spanish Roman Catholic prelate who served as Bishop of Quito (1653–1687).

== Biography ==
Alfonso de la Peña Montenegro was born in Padrón, in the Kingdom of Galicia, Castile, on 29 April 1596. On 4 March 1653, he was selected by the King of Spain and confirmed by Pope Innocent X on 18 August 1653 as Bishop of Quito. In April 1654, he was consecrated bishop by Cristóbal de Torres, Archbishop of Santafé en Nueva Granada. He served as Bishop of Quito until his death in 1687.

== External links and additional sources ==
- Chow, Gabriel. "Metropolitan Archdiocese of Concepción (Chile)". GCatholic.org. (for Chronology of Bishops) ^{[self-published]}
- Cheney, David M. "Archdiocese of Quito". Catholic-Hierarchy.org. (for Chronology of Bishops) ^{[self-published]}

Catholic Church titles
Preceded by Agustín de Ugarte y Sarabia	Bishop of Quito; 1653–1687	Succeeded by Sancho de Andrade de Figueroa
