= Juan de Almoguera =

Most Reverend Juan de Almoguera
- Archbishop of Lima
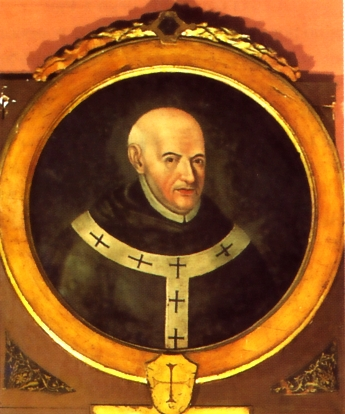
- Church: Catholic Church
- Diocese: Archbishop of Lima
- In office: 1673–1676
- Predecessor: Pedro de Villagómez Vivanco
- Successor: Melchor de Liñán y Cisneros
- Previous post: Bishop of Arequipa (1659–1673)

Orders
- Consecration: March 24, 1661 by Agustín Muñoz Sandoval

Personal details
- Born: February 18, 1605 Córdoba, Spain
- Died: March 2, 1676 (aged 71)

Juan de Almoguera, O.SS.T. (February 18, 1605 – March 2, 1676) was a Roman Catholic prelate who served as Archbishop of Lima (1673–1676) and Bishop of Arequipa (1659–1673).

== Biography ==
Juan de Almoguera was born in Córdoba, Spain and ordained a priest in the Trinitarian Order. On February 17, 1659, Pope Alexander VII, appointed him Bishop of Arequipa. On March 24, 1661, he was consecrated bishop by Agustín Muñoz Sandoval, Bishop of Cuzco. On November 27, 1673, Pope Urban VIII, appointed him Archbishop of Lima where he served until his death on March 2, 1676.

== See also ==
- Catholic Church in Peru

== External links and additional sources ==
- Cheney, David M. "Archdiocese of Arequipa". Catholic-Hierarchy.org. (for Chronology of Bishops) ^{[self-published]}
- Chow, Gabriel. "Metropolitan Archdiocese of Arequipa". GCatholic.org. (for Chronology of Bishops) ^{[self-published]}
- Cheney, David M. "Archdiocese of Lima". Catholic-Hierarchy.org. (for Chronology of Bishops) ^{[self-published]}
- Chow, Gabriel. "Metropolitan Archdiocese of Lima (Peru)". GCatholic.org. (for Chronology of Bishops) ^{[self-published]}

Catholic Church titles
Preceded by Gaspar de Villarroel	Bishop of Arequipa; 1659–1673	Succeeded by Juan de la Calle y Heredia
Preceded by Pedro de Villagómez Vivanco	Archbishop of Lima; 1673–1676	Succeeded by Melchor de Liñán y Cisneros
