= Juan Alonso y Ocón =

Spanish Roman Catholic prelate

The Most Reverend Juan Alonso y Ocón
- Archbishop of La Plata o Charcas
- Church: Catholic Church
- Archdiocese: Archbishop of La Plata o Charcas
- In office: 1651–1656
- Predecessor: Pedro de Oviedo Falconi
- Successor: Gaspar de Villarroel
- Previous posts: Bishop of Yucatán (1638–1642); Bishop of Cuzco (1642–1651)

Orders
- Consecration: 1638 by Diego Castejón Fonseca

Personal details
- Born: 21 March 1597 Villa de Ocón, Spain
- Died: 12 October 1656 (aged 59) Yucatán

Juan Alonso y Ocón (21 March 1597 – 12 October 1656) was a Roman Catholic prelate who served as Archbishop of La Plata o Charcas (1651–1656), Bishop of Cuzco (1642–1651), and Bishop of Yucatán (1638–1642).

== Biography ==
Juan Alonso y Ocón was born in Villa de Ocón, Spain. On 14 June 1638 he was selected by the King of Spain and confirmed by Pope Urban VIII as Bishop of Yucatán. He was consecrated bishop by Diego Castejón Fonseca, Bishop Emeritus of Lugo with Miguel Avellán, Auxiliary Bishop of Toledo, and Timoteo Pérez Vargas, Bishop of Ispahan, serving as co-consecrators. On 3 November 1642 he was selected by the King of Spain and confirmed on 31 August 1643 by Pope Urban VIII as Bishop of Cuzco. On 2 April 1651 he was selected by the King of Spain and confirmed by Pope Innocent X as Bishop of La Plata o Charcas where he served until his death on 12 October 1656.

== Episcopal succession ==
While bishop, he was the principal consecrator of:

- Mauro Diego de Tovar y Valle Maldonado, Bishop of Caracas, Santiago de Venezuela (1639);

and the principal co-consecrator of:

- Diego Rueda Rico, Bishop of Tui (1639);
- Francisco Diego Alarcón y Covarrubias, Bishop of Ciudad Rodrigo (1639);
- Cesare Facchinetti, Apostolic Nuncio to Spain (1639);
- Juan Coello Ribera y Sandoval, Bishop of Zamora (1639);
- Mendo de Benavides, Bishop of Segovia (1639); and
- Juan de Palafox y Mendoza, Bishop of Tlaxcala (1639).

== External links and additional sources ==
- Cheney, David M. "Archdiocese of Cuzco". Catholic-Hierarchy.org. (for Chronology of Bishops) ^{[self-published]}
- Chow, Gabriel. "Metropolitan Archdiocese of Cusco (Peru)". GCatholic.org. (for Chronology of Bishops) ^{[self-published]}
- Cheney, David M. "Archdiocese of Yucatán". Catholic-Hierarchy.org. (for Chronology of Bishops) ^{[self-published]}
- Chow, Gabriel. "Metropolitan Archdiocese of Yucatán". GCatholic.org. (for Chronology of Bishops) ^{[self-published]}
- Cheney, David M. "Archdiocese of Sucre". Catholic-Hierarchy.org. (for Chronology of Bishops) ^{[self-published]}
- Chow, Gabriel. "Metropolitan Archdiocese of Sucre (Bolivia)". GCatholic.org. (for Chronology of Bishops) ^{[self-published]}

Catholic Church titles
Preceded by Gonzalo de Salazar (bishop)	Bishop of Yucatán; 1638–1642	Succeeded by Andrés Fernandez de Ipenza
Preceded by Diego Montoya Mendoza	Bishop of Cuzco; 1642–1651	Succeeded by Pedro de Ortega y Sotomayor
Preceded by Pedro de Oviedo Falconi	Archbishop of La Plata o Charcas; 1651–1656	Succeeded by Gaspar de Villarroel
