= Santa Inés, Bogotá =

Santa Inés
- Barrio
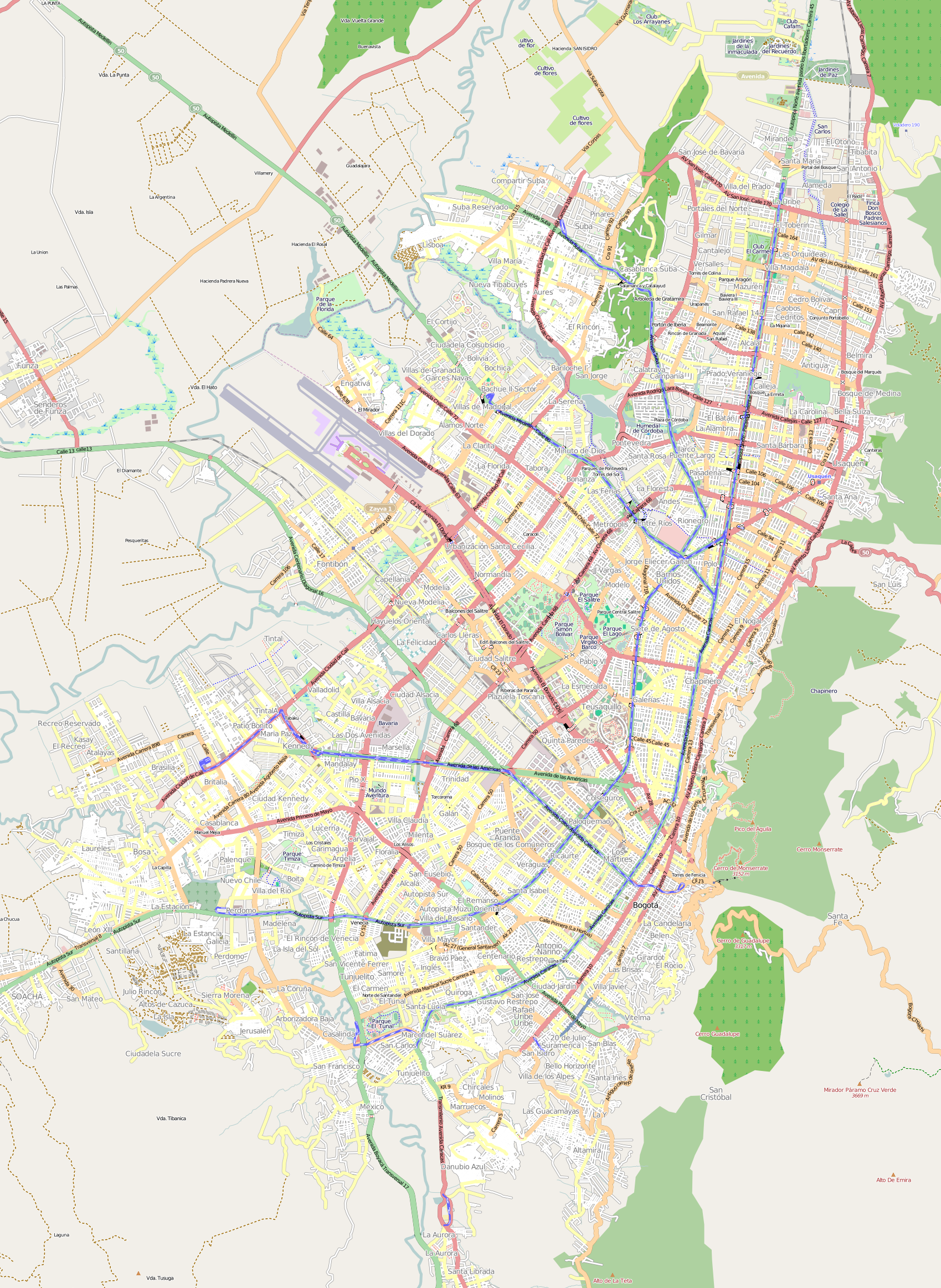
- Location within Bogotá, Colombia
- Country: Colombia
- Department: Distrito Capital
- City: Bogotá

Santa Inés is a neighbourhood (barrio) of Bogotá, Colombia.
