= Agustín de Ugarte y Sarabia =

Most Reverend Agustín de Ugarte y Sarabia
- Bishop of Quito
- Church: Catholic Church
- Diocese: Diocese of Quito
- In office: 1647–1650
- Predecessor: Pedro de Oviedo Falconi
- Successor: Alfonso de la Peña y Montenegro

Orders
- Consecration: 24 August 1631 by Luis Córdoba Ronquillo

Personal details
- Born: Viceroyalty of New Granada, Spanish Empire
- Died: 6 December 1650 Quito, Royal Audiencia of Quito, Viceroyalty of Peru, Spanish Empire

Agustín de Ugarte y Sarabia (died 6 December 1650) was a Roman Catholic prelate who served as Bishop of Quito (1647–1650), Bishop of Arequipa (1640–1647), Bishop of Santiago de Guatemala (1630–1640), and Bishop of Chiapas (1629–1630).

== Biography ==
On 3 December 1629, Agustín de Ugarte y Sarabia, a native of the Viceroyalty of New Granada, was appointed during the papacy of Pope Urban VIII as Bishop of Chiapas. On 2 December 1630, he was appointed during the papacy of Pope Urban VIII as Bishop of Santiago de Guatemala. On 24 August 1631, he was consecrated bishop by Luis Córdoba Ronquillo, Bishop of Cartagena. On 19 November 1640, he was appointed during the papacy of Pope Urban VIII as Bishop of Arequipa. On 21 October 1647, he was appointed during the papacy of Pope Innocent X as Bishop of Quito. He served as Bishop of Quito until his death on 6 December 1650.

== External links and additional sources ==
- Cheney, David M. "Diocese of San Cristóbal de Las Casas". Catholic-Hierarchy.org. (for Chronology of Bishops) ^{[self-published]}
- Chow, Gabriel. "Diocese of San Cristóbal de Las Casas". GCatholic.org. (for Chronology of Bishops) ^{[self-published]}
- Cheney, David M. "Archdiocese of Guatemala". Catholic-Hierarchy.org. (for Chronology of Bishops) ^{[self-published]}
- Chow, Gabriel. "Metropolitan Archdiocese of Santiago de Guatemala". GCatholic.org. (for Chronology of Bishops) ^{[self-published]}
- Cheney, David M. "Archdiocese of Arequipa". Catholic-Hierarchy.org. (for Chronology of Bishops) ^{[self-published]}
- Chow, Gabriel. "Metropolitan Archdiocese of Arequipa". GCatholic.org. (for Chronology of Bishops) ^{[self-published]}
- Chow, Gabriel. "Metropolitan Archdiocese of Concepción (Chile)". GCatholic.org. (for Chronology of Bishops) ^{[self-published]}
- Cheney, David M. "Archdiocese of Quito". Catholic-Hierarchy.org. (for Chronology of Bishops) ^{[self-published]}

Catholic Church titles
Preceded by Bernardino de Salazar y Frías	Bishop of Chiapas; 1629–1630	Succeeded by Marcos Ramírez de Prado y Ovando
Preceded by Juan de Zapata y Sandoval	Bishop of Santiago de Guatemala; 1630–1640	Succeeded by Bartolomé González Soltero
Preceded by Pedro de Villagómez	Bishop of Arequipa; 1640–1647	Succeeded by Pedro de Ortega y Sotomayor
Preceded by Pedro de Oviedo Falconi	Bishop of Quito; 1647–1650	Succeeded by Alfonso de la Peña y Montenegro
