= Mijancas =

Hamlet in Álava, Spain

- Concejo
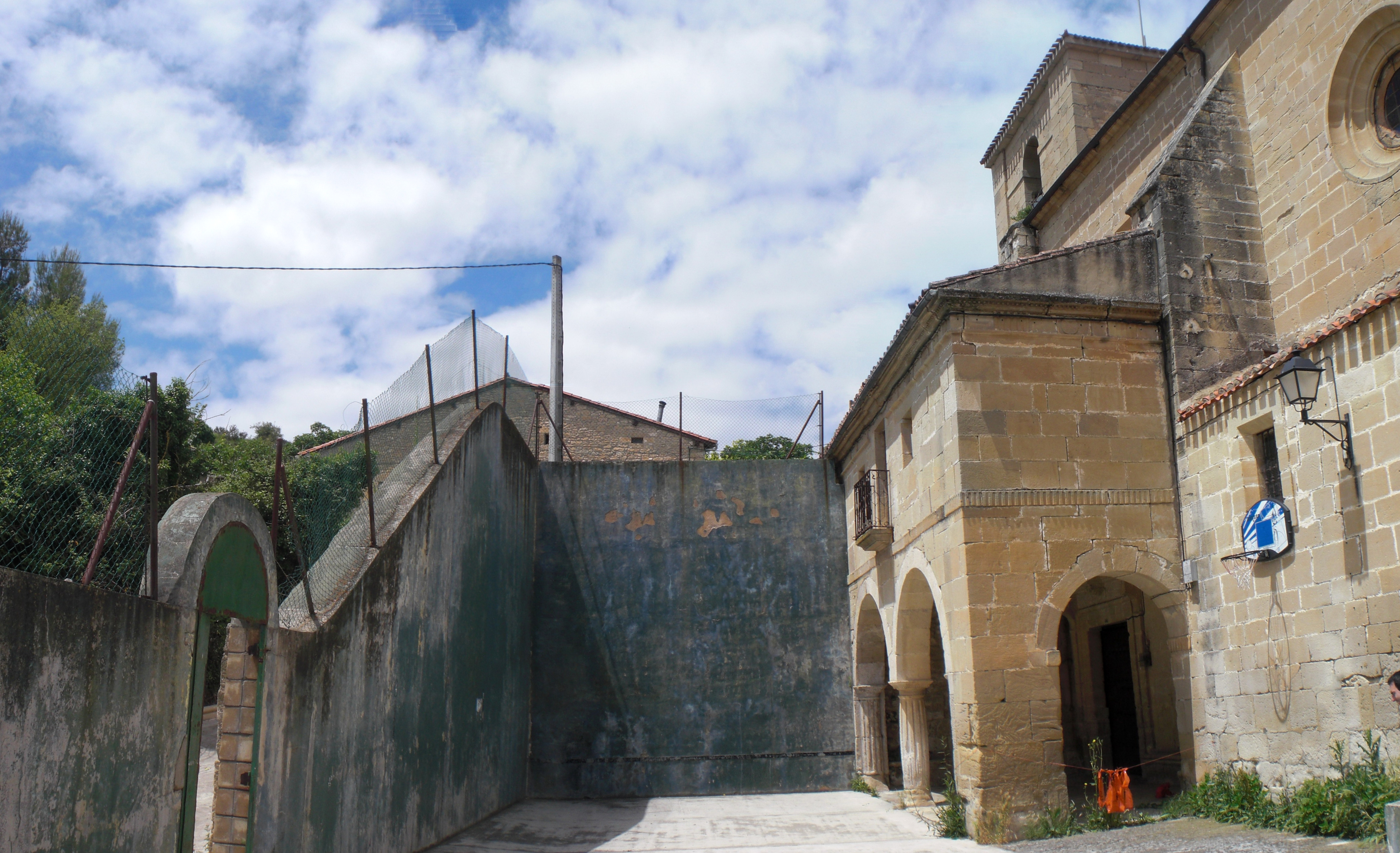
- The church of Mijancas

- Location within Álava Location within the Basque Country Location within Spain
- Coordinates: 42°41′44″N 2°49′01″W
- Country: Spain
- Autonomous community: Basque Country
- Province: Álava
- Comarca: Añana
- Municipality: Berantevilla

Area
  - Total: 8.27 km^{2} (3.19 sq mi)
- Elevation: 524 m (1,719 ft)

Population (2024)
  - Total: 37
  - Density: 4.5/km^{2} (12/sq mi)
- Postal code: 01211

Mijancas is a hamlet and concejo in the municipality of Berantevilla, in Álava province, Basque Country, Spain.
