= Santo Tomé, Spain =

Santo Tomé
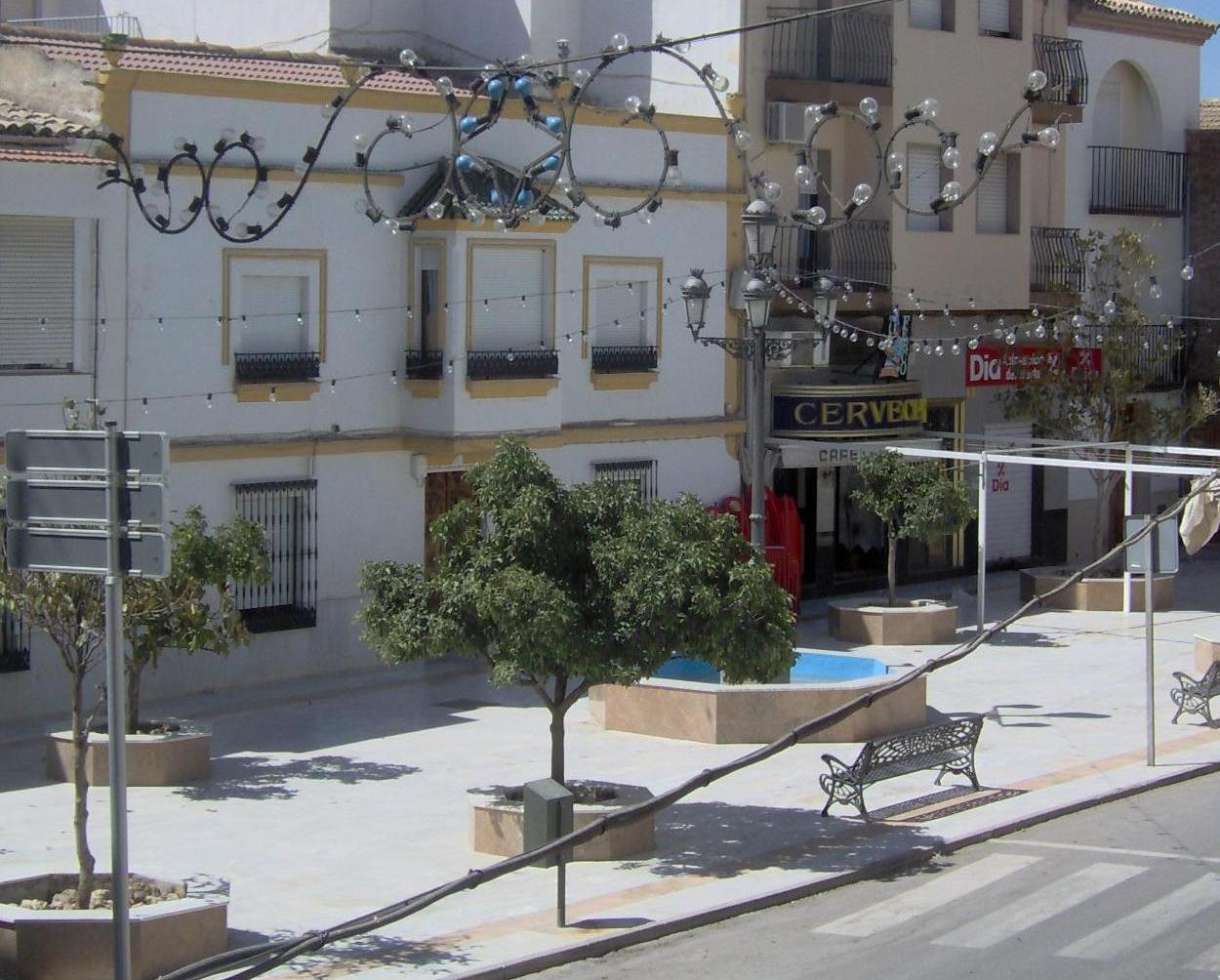

- Coat of arms

- Location in the Province of Jaén Santo Tomé, Spain (Andalusia) Santo Tomé, Spain (Spain)
- Coordinates: 38°01′N 3°06′W
- Country: Spain
- Autonomous community: Andalusia
- Province: Jaén

Area
  - Total: 73.42 km^{2} (28.35 sq mi)
- Elevation: 454 m (1,490 ft)

Population (2025-01-01)
  - Total: 2,029
  - Density: 27.64/km^{2} (71.58/sq mi)
- Time zone: UTC+1 (CET)
  - Summer (DST): UTC+2 (CEST)

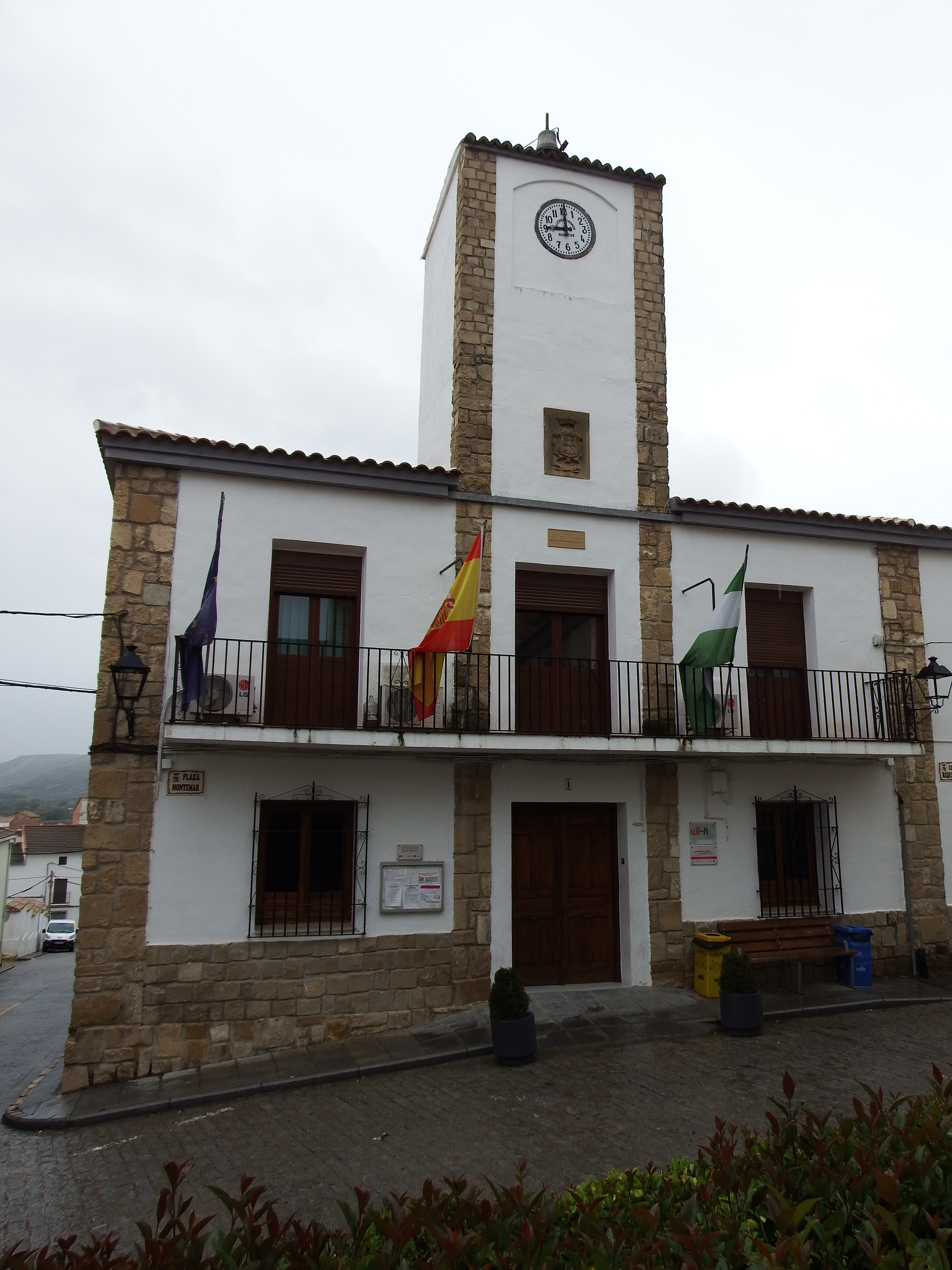

Santo Tomé is a municipality in the province of Jaén, Spain.

== See also ==
- List of municipalities in Jaén
