= Archdiocese of Quito =

Catholic archdiocese in Ecuador

Coordinates: 0.2206°S 78.5128°W

Archdiocese of Quito Archidioecesis Quitensis

Catholic
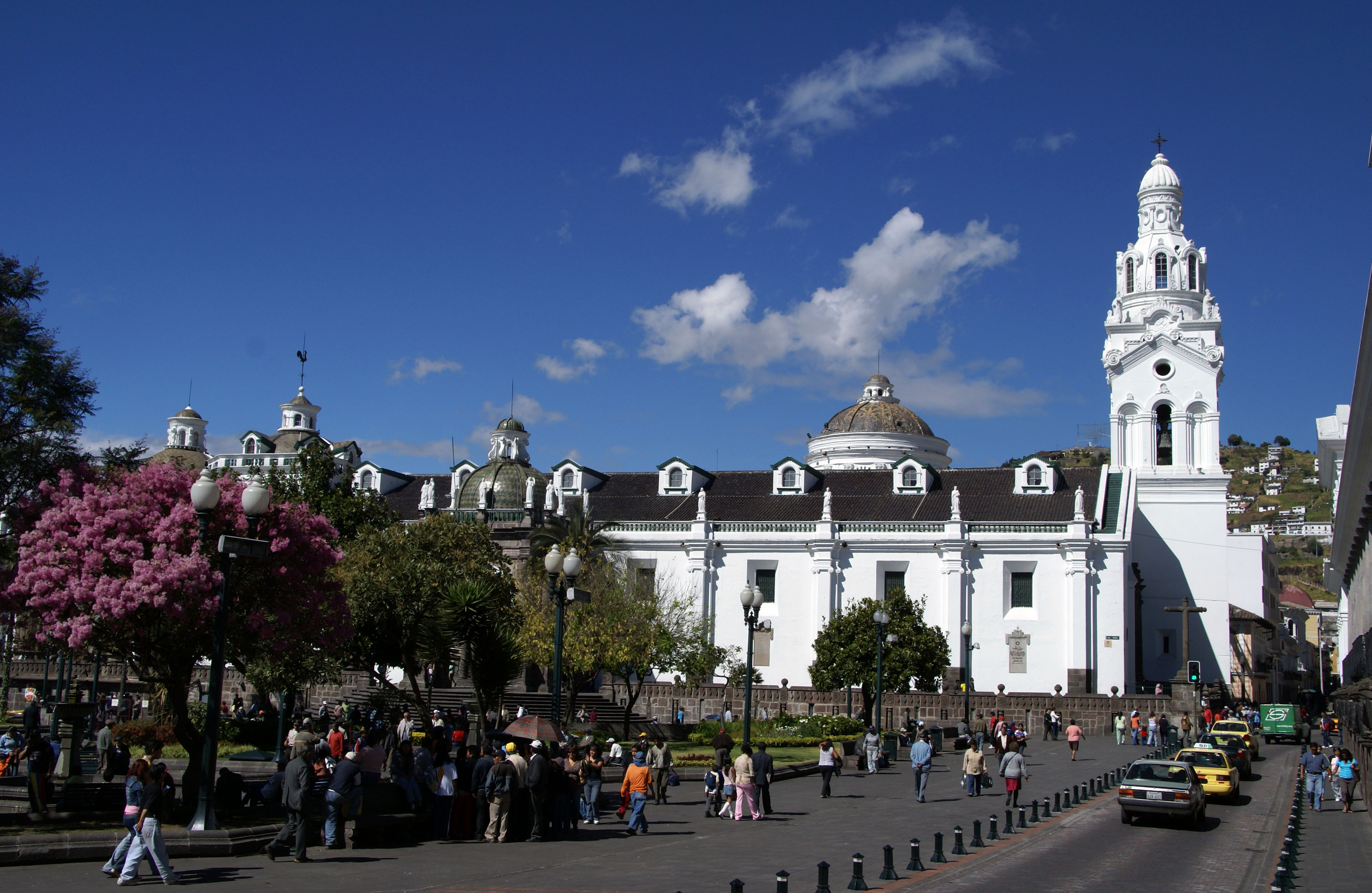
- Catedral metropolitana Quito

Location
- Country: Ecuador
- Territory: Province of Pichincha (except the cantons of Pedro Vicente Maldonado, Puerto Quito, and San Miguel de los Bancos
- Ecclesiastical province: Province of Quito

Statistics
- Area: 11,167 km^{2} (4,312 sq mi)
- Population: Total; Catholics: (as of 2010); 2,350,000; 2,115,000 (90%)
- Parishes: 173

Information
- Denomination: Catholic
- Sui iuris church: Latin Church
- Rite: Roman Rite
- Established: 8 January 1545 (Erected as Diocese); 13 January 1848 (Elevated to Archdiocese)
- Cathedral: Catedral Primada de la Virgen Asunta al Cielo

Current leadership
- Pope: Leo XIV
- Archbishop: Alfredo José Espinoza Mateus, S.D.B.
- Auxiliary Bishops: Danilo Echeverría Verdesoto; David Israel De la Torre Altamirano, SS.CC.
- Bishops emeritus: Fausto Trávez Trávez, OFM

Map
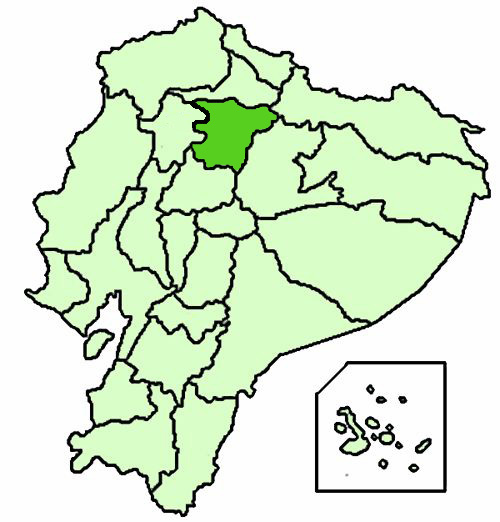

Website
- arquidiocesisdequito.com.ec

The Metropolitan Archdiocese of Quito is the Catholic archdiocese in the capital city of Ecuador, Quito. It was established as the Diocese of Quito on 8 January 1545, before being elevated to archdiocese level on January 13, 1848 by Pope Pius IX.

== Bishops ==
Bishops of Quito

- García Díaz Arias (8 Jan 1546 – 1562)
- Pedro de la Peña, OP (15 May 1565 – 7 Mar 1583)
- Antonio Avendaño y Paz, OFM (9 Mar 1588 – 7 Nov 1590)
- Luis López de Solís, OSA (7 Sep 1592 – 18 Jul 1605), appointed Archbishop of La Plata o Charcas, Bolivia
- Salvador Ribera Avalos, OP (17 Aug 1605 – 1612)
- Hernando de Arias y Ugarte (22 Apr 1613 – 14 Mar 1616), appointed Archbishop of Santafé en Nueva Granada, Colombia
- Alfonso Santillán Fajardo, OP (23 Mar 1616 – 15 Oct 1620)
- Francisco Sotomayor, OFM (18 Dec 1623 – 5 Jun 1628), appointed Archbishop of La Plata o Charcas, Bolivia
- Pedro de Oviedo Falconi, OCist (10 Jul 1628 – 21 Aug 1645); Archbishop (personal title); appointed Archbishop of La Plata o Charcas, Bolivia
- Agustín de Ugarte y Sarabia (1648 – 6 Dec 1650)
- Alfonso de la Peña y Montenegro (18 Aug 1653 – 1687)
- Sancho de Andrade de Figueroa (15 Nov 1688 – 1702)
- Diego Ladrón de Guevara (15 Sep 1704 – 1710)
- Luis Francisco Romero (12 Jul 1717 – 19 Nov 1725), appointed Archbishop of La Plata o Charcas, Bolivia
- Juan Gómez de Neva y Frías (19 Nov 1725 – 21 Aug 1729)
- Andrés Paredes Polanco y Armendáriz (18 Jun 1731 – 3 Jul 1745)
- Juan Nieto Polo del Aguila (28 Nov 1746 – 12 Mar 1759)
- Pedro Ponce y Carrasco (20 Dec 1762 – 28 Oct 1775)
- Blas Manuel Sobrino y Minayo (16 Dec 1776 – 15 Dec 1788), appointed Bishop of Santiago de Chile
- José Pérez Calama (30 Mar 1789 – 2 Dec 1792)
- José Fernández Díaz de la Madrid, OFM (3 December 1792 – 4 June 1794)
- Miguel Alvarez Cortes (22 September 1795 – 1 February 1801)
- José de Cuero y Caicedo (23 December 1801 – 10 December 1815)
- Leonardo Santander y Villavicencio (2 October 1818 – 29 April 1824)
- Rafael Lasso de la Vega (15 December 1828 – 16 April 1831)
- Nicolás Joaquín de Arteta y Calisto (29 July 1833 – 6 September 1849)

Archbishops of Quito

- Francisco Xavier de Garaycoa Llaguno (5 September 1851 – 2 December 1959)
- José María Riofrío y Valdivieso (22 July 1861 – 2 April 1867)
- José María de Jesús Yerovi Pintado, OFMObs (2 April 1867 – 20 June 1867)
- José Ignacio Checa y Barba (16 March 1868 – 30 March 1877)
- José Ignacio Ordóñez (3 July 1882 – 14 July 1893)
- Pedro Rafael González y Calixto (14 July 1893 – 27 March 1905)
- Federico González Suárez (14 December 1905 – 5 December 1917)
- Manuel María Pólit y Lasso (7 June 1918 – 30 October 1932)
- Carlos María de la Torre (8 September 1933 – 23 June 1967); elevated to Cardinal in 1953
- Pablo Muñoz Vega, SJ (23 June 1967 – 1 June 1985); elevated to Cardinal in 1969
- Antonio José González Zumárraga (1 June 1985 – 21 March 2003); elevated to Cardinal in 2001
- Raúl Eduardo Vela Chiriboga (21 March 2003 – 11 September 2010); elevated to Cardinal in 2010
- Fausto Trávez Trávez, OFM (11 September 2010 – 5 April 2019)
- Alfredo José Espinoza Mateus, SDB (5 April 2019 – present)

=== Coadjutor bishops ===
- José María de Jesús Yerovi Pintado, OFMObs (1865-1867)
- Pedro Rafael González y Calixto (1893)
- Pablo Muñoz Vega, SJ (1964-1967); future Cardinal
- Antonio José González Zumárraga (1980-1985); future Cardinal

=== Auxiliary bishops ===
- Miguel Fernández Flórez, OFMObs (1815-1817)
- José Miguel Carrión y Valdivieso (1840-1842)
- José María Riofrío y Valdivieso (1853-1861), appointed Archbishop here
- Ulpiano María Pérez y Quiñones (1907), appointed Bishop of Ibarra
- Benigno Chiriboga, SJ (1958-1963), appointed Bishop of Latacunga
- Antonio José González Zumárraga (1969-1980), appointed Coadjutor here; future Cardinal
- Juan Ignacio Larrea Holguín (1969-1980), appointed Bishop of Ibarra
- Luis Alberto Luna Tobar, OCD (1977-1981), appointed Archbishop of Cuenca
- Emilio Lorenzo Stehle (1983-1987), appointed Prelate of Santo Domingo de los Colorados
- Luis Enrique Orellana Ricaurte, SJ (1986-1994)
- Antonio Arregui Yarza (1990-1995), appointed Bishop of Ibarra
- Carlos Anibal Altamirano Argüello (1994-2004), appointed Bishop of Azogues
- Julio César Terán Dutari, SJ (1995-2004), appointed Bishop of Ibarra
- Segundo René Coba Galarza (2006-2014), appointed Bishop of Ecuador, Military
- Vincente Danilo Echeverría Verdesoto (2006-
- David Israel De la Torre Altamirano, SSCC (2019-

=== Other priests of this diocese who became bishops ===
- Miguel Angel Aguilar Miranda, appointed Bishop of Guaranda in 1991
- Skiper Bladimir Yáñez Calvachi, appointed Bishop of Guaranda in 2014

== Suffragan dioceses ==
- Diocese of Ambato
- Diocese of Guaranda
- Diocese of Ibarra
- Diocese of Latacunga
- Diocese of Riobamba
- Diocese of Tulcán
