= Julio Terrazas Sandoval =

His Eminence Julio Terrazas Sandoval
- Cardinal, Archbishop Emeritus of Santa Cruz de la Sierra
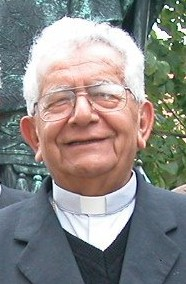
- Church: Catholic Church
- Archdiocese: Santa Cruz de la Sierra
- Appointed: 6 February 1991
- Installed: 14 April 1991
- Term ended: 25 May 2013
- Predecessor: Luis Aníbal Rodríguez Pardo
- Successor: Sergio Alfredo Gualberti Calandrina (previously, Coadjutor Archbishop of Santa Cruz de la Sierra)
- Other post: Cardinal-Priest of San Giovanni Battista de’ Rossi
- Previous posts: Auxiliary Bishop of La Paz (1978-1982); Titular Bishop of Apisa Maius (1978-1982); Bishop of Oruro (1982-1991)

Orders
- Ordination: 29 July 1962 by Bernardo Leonardo Fey Schneider
- Consecration: 8 June 1978 by José Clemente Maurer
- Created cardinal: 21 February 2001 by John Paul II
- Rank: Cardinal-Priest

Personal details
- Born: March 7, 1936 Vallegrande, Bolivia
- Died: December 9, 2015 (aged 79) Santa Cruz, Bolivia
- Denomination: Roman Catholic
- Coat of arms

Julio Terrazas Sandoval (March 7, 1936 – December 9, 2015) was a Cardinal Priest and Archbishop Emeritus of the Roman Catholic Archdiocese of Santa Cruz de la Sierra in the Roman Catholic Church.

== Biography ==
Born in Vallegrande, Bolivia, he was the member of the Terrazas family, prominent in Cochabamba and Santa Cruz. He was a close relative of Generals Hernán Terrazas Céspedes and David Terrazas Villegas, and a distant relative of Melchor Terrazas and Manuel Terrazas.

Terrazas Sandoval was ordained a priest in 1962. He earned a degree in social ministry from EMACAS University, France. In Bolivia, he was superior of the Vallegrande Redemptorist community before being appointed Auxiliary of La Paz in 1978. He was later transferred to Oruro in 1982. He chaired the Episcopal Commission on the Laity, Youth and Vocations, was a member of CELAM's Commission on the Laity, and was elected President of the Bolivian Episcopal Conference on four occasions.

Appointed Archbishop of Santa Cruz in 1991, Terrazas Sandoval was made a Cardinal by Pope John Paul II on 21 February 2001. He was one of the cardinal electors who participated in the 2005 papal conclave that selected Pope Benedict XVI, and also one of the cardinal electors who participated in the 2013 papal conclave that selected Pope Francis.

On May 25, 2013, Pope Francis accepted the resignation he submitted when he turned 75. He was immediately succeeded as Archbishop of Santa Cruz de la Sierra by his Coadjutor Archbishop, Sergio Alfredo Gualberti Calandrina.

Terrazas died aged 79 after several complications in his health.
