= David Terrazas Villegas =

Bolivian military officer who was Commanding General of the Bolivian Army

David Terrazas
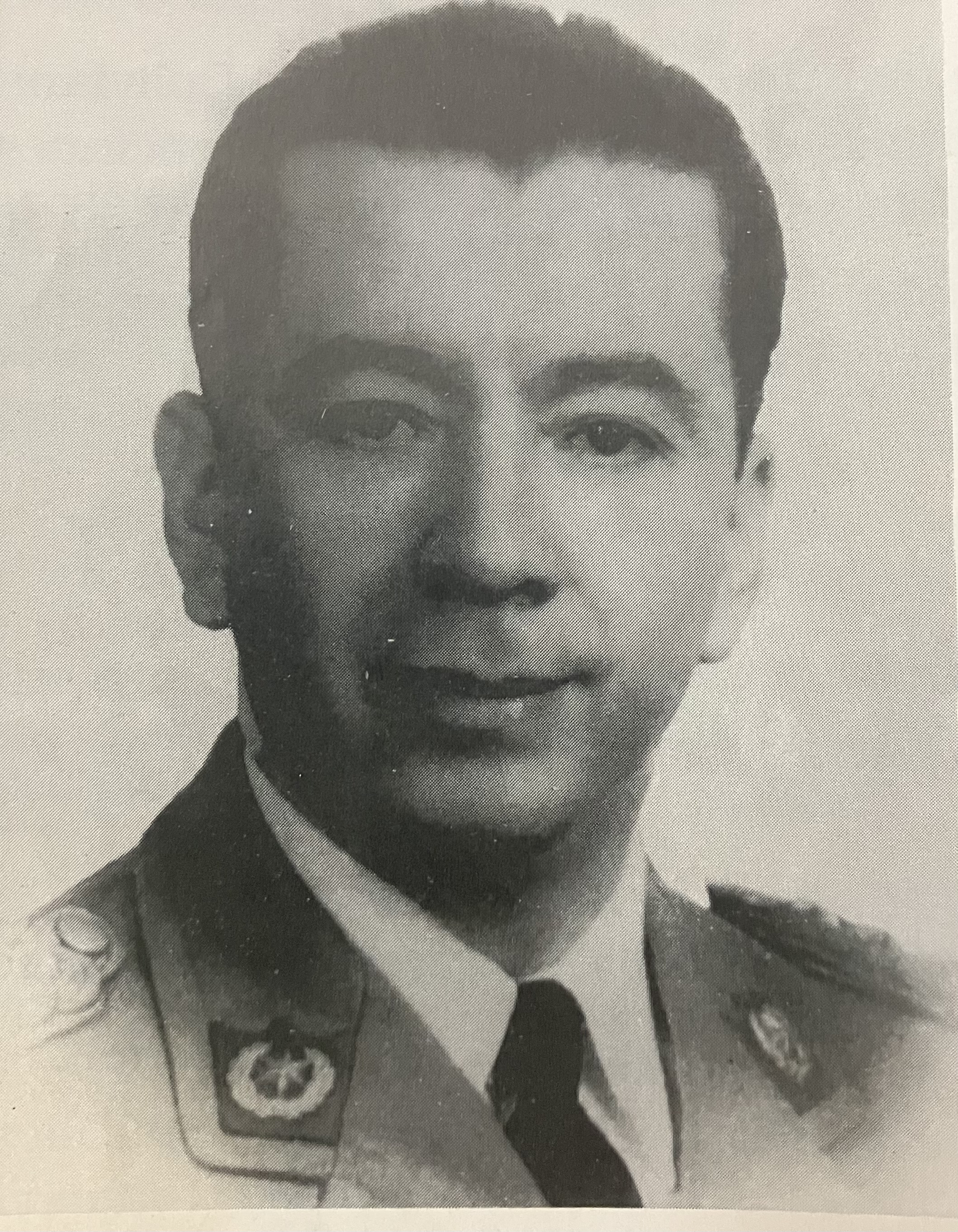

Commanding General of the Bolivian Army
- In office 16 July 1946 – 16 January 1949

Personal details
- Born: December 14, 1908 Vallegrande, Bolivia
- Died: August 22, 1955 Salta, Argentina
- Relations: Melchor Terrazas; Manuel Terrazas; Hernán Terrazas Céspedes; Julio Terrazas Sandoval; Carlos Manuel de Villegas
- Education: Military College of La Paz
- Occupation: Military officer, diplomat
- Awards: Legion of Merit; Order of the Condor of the Andes; Legion of Honour; Order of the Liberator General San Martín; Order of Military Merit (Brazil)

Military service
- Branch/service: Bolivian Army
- Years of service: 1929–1952
- Rank: Division general
- Battles/wars: Chaco War; Korean War (as an attaché)

David Terrazas Villegas (14 December 1908 – 22 August 1955) was a Bolivian military officer who was Commanding General of the Bolivian Army during the last years of the so-called 'oligarchic republic'. Terrazas fought during the Chaco War, where he earned several promotions in rank. He was one of the few military personnel from Bolivia to actively participate in the Korean War, for which he received the Legion of Merit in 1951 for "exceptionally meritorious conduct in the performance of outstanding services to the Government of the United States". Because of his political affiliations, he was exiled when the Revolutionary Nationalist Movement took power in 1952. Three years later, he was assassinated most likely because of his continued support for the opposition in Bolivia.

== Early life ==
Terrazas was born in Vallegrande, Santa Cruz Department, on December 14, 1908. His family was originally from Cochabamba, relocating to Vallegrande when his father found work there. When Terrazas was fifteen, he was sent to La Paz to attend military school. In 1929, he graduated from the Military College of La Paz as a second lieutenant of Infantry.

== Chaco War ==
Promoted to lieutenant in 1932, he participated in the first phase of the Chaco War as the Chief Officer of the Third Division. In the second phase of the war, he took part in the combats of Ingavi, Platanillos, Campo Jurado; in significant operations like La China, Strongest, Laguna Loa, Campo Santa Cruz, and November 27 as the Commander of the Montes Regiment. In the third phase, Terrazas participated during the retreat of the Cavalry Corps of the Second Army Corps. Later, in Carandaiti, Villamontes, Aguara, Parapeti, Laguna Camatindi, where he was wounded. Terrazas was also a part of the offensive in the central sector; the retaking of Boyuibe; the advancement to Huirapitini and Mandeyapecua as the commander of the Beni 16th Infantry Regiment. In 1935, he was promoted to the rank of captain in the midst of the battlefield. He earned several citations for his high morale and courageous action against the enemy.

== Senior military officer ==
Through competitive examination, he obtained a scholarship to France, where he earned the diploma as a Chief of Staff Officer at the École militaire in Paris, ranking first among the latinamerican students. Upon returning to his country, he was served as Battalion Commander at the Military College of La Paz from 1941 to 1943. In 1944, he served as Military Attaché at the Embassy of Bolivia in Chile. In 1946, he was appointed Commanding General of the Army during a time of institutional crisis, which he successfully navigated. He left the position in 1949 and took on the role of Military Attaché at the Embassy of Bolivia in Washington, D.C. In this role, Terrazas was sent as an attaché from Bolivia to Korea, representing his country in the Korean War, where he saw some action.

He received all the possible decorations awarded by the Bolivian Army for acts of war. The nation bestowed upon him the Condor of the Andes, in rank of Commander and Grand Cross. He held the Legion of Honor from France, the Order of the Liberator General San Martín of Argentina, Grand Officer of Order of Military Merit of Brazil, and another from the United States of America.

== Exile and assassination ==
In 1951, Mamerto Urriolagoitía launched a self-coup, known as mamertazo, that placed the army in command of the country. Hugo Ballivián, as Commanding General of the Army, became President of Bolivia that year. Terrazas remained in his position in Washington D.C. until the Bolivian National Revolution of 1952 ousted the incumbent government. With the Revolutionary Nationalist Movement in power, Terrazas was recalled to Bolivia. Harassed by his detractors within the Armed Forces, in 1952 he went into exile in the Republic of Peru. There, he lived in Lima, where he managed a prestigious industrial company.

However, despite his exile, he maintained contact with dissidents within Bolivia. His correspondence intercepted in 1953, he was deemed a threat to national security. While his plots may have been harmless, Terrazas was implicated in a movement to oust Víctor Paz Estenssoro. A few years later, Terrazas traveled to Argentina for personal reasons, where was assassinated on August 22, 1955, presumably for political motives. His assassination remains a mystery, although his support for the opposition in Bolivia might have ultimately led to his demise.

== Marriage and family ==
Terrazas married Bethsabe Virrueta Aponte, a member of a wealthy family from Cochabamba. Through his mother, Terrazas was the grandson of General Carlos Manuel de Villegas and great-grandson of General Carlos de Villegas. He was a member of the Terrazas family, which includes Melchor Terrazas, Manuel Terrazas, Julio Terrazas Sandoval and Hernán Terrazas Céspedes. He was a second cousin of Hernán, who was also a military officer and served as Mayor of Cochabamba.
