= Melchor Liñán y Cisneros =

Roman Catholic prelate (1629–1708)

Most Reverend Melchor de Liñán y Cisneros
- Archbishop of Lima
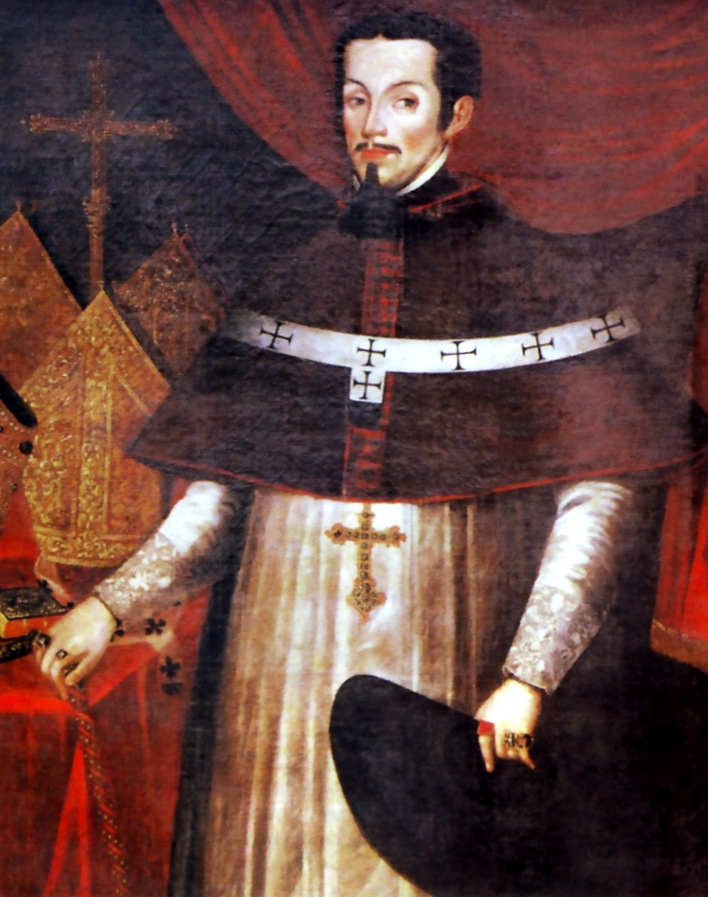
- Church: Catholic Church
- Diocese: Archbishop of Lima
- Predecessor: Juan de Almoguera
- Successor: Antonio de Zuloaga
- Previous posts: Archbishop of La Plata o Charcas (1672–1675); Bishop of Popayán (1667–1672); Bishop of Santa Marta (1664–1668)

Orders
- Consecration: 1665 by Antonio Sanz Lozano

Personal details
- Born: 19 December 1629 Madrid, Spain
- Died: 28 June 1708 (aged 78)

Melchor Liñán y Cisneros (sometimes Melchor de Liñán y Cisneros) (19 December 1629, Madrid – 28 June 1708, Lima, Peru) was a Roman Catholic prelate who served as Archbishop of Lima (1677–1708), Archbishop of La Plata o Charcas (1672–1675), Bishop of Popayán (1667–1672), and Bishop of Santa Marta (1664–1668). He also served as Viceroy of Peru from 7 July 1678 to 20 November 1681.

== Biography ==
Melchor de Liñán y Cisneros was born in Madrid, Spain. He studied theology in the University of Alcalá de Henares, where he took his doctorate. Thereafter he was chaplain in Buitrago. He was also calificador (censor) of the Holy Office of the Inquisition. On 6 October 1664 Pope Alexander VII, appointed him Bishop of Santa Marta. In 1665, he was consecrated bishop by Antonio Sanz Lozano, Bishop of Cartagena. On 26 January 1668 Pope Clement IX, appointed him Bishop of Popayán.

In 1671, he was sent as visitador (inspector) to Nuevo Reino de Granada in what is now Colombia because of the inaction of Diego de Villalba y Toledo, president of the Audiencia. He replaced Villabla in that position on 2 June 1671. At the same time he served as interim governor and captain general of Nuevo Reino de Granada. On 8 February 1672, Pope Clement X, appointed him Archbishop of La Plata o Charcas. On 14 June 1677 Pope Innocent XI appointed him Archbishop of Lima. On 7 July 1678 he was appointed viceroy of Peru serving until 20 November 1681. As viceroy, he improved the fortifications of the port of Callao to defend against attacks by Dutch filibusters. He repressed rebellions of the clergy, who were opposed to the nomination of prelates from Spain—the Franciscans in Cuzco and the Dominicans in Quito.

On the death of the Peruvian astronomer Doctor Francisco Ruiz Lozano, Viceroy Liñán y Cisneros (with the approval of the Crown) gave mathematics a permanent position in the University of San Marcos. Mathematics was attached to the chair of cosmography. Doctor Juan Ramón Koening, a Belgian by birth, was named to the chair.

As a reward for his services, the Spanish Crown granted Liñán y Cisneros the title of conde de la Puebla de los Valles. He wrote Ofensa y defensa de la libertad eclesiástica (Offense and Defence of Ecclesiastical Liberty). He died in Lima in 1708.

== Episcopal succession ==
While bishop, he was the principal consecrator of:

- Bernardo de Carrasco y Saavedra, Bishop of Santiago de Chile;
- Juan Queipo de Llano y Valdés (archbishop), Bishop of La Paz;
- Pedro Cárdenas y Arbieto, Bishop of Santa Cruz de la Sierra;
- Antonio de Morales, Bishop of Concepción;
- Juan de los Ríos y Berriz, Bishop of Santa Cruz de la Sierra;
- Sebastián de Pastrana, Bishop of Paraguay;
- Francisco Cisneros y Mendoza, Auxiliary Bishop of Lima;
- Pedro Vásquez de Velasco, Bishop of Santa Cruz de la Sierra; and
- Juan González de Santiago, Bishop of Cuzco.

== External links and additional sources ==
- (in Spanish) Short biography
- Cheney, David M. "Diocese of Santa Marta". Catholic-Hierarchy.org. (for Chronology of Bishops) ^{[self-published]}
- Chow, Gabriel. "Metropolitan Diocese of Santa Marta (Colombia)". GCatholic.org. (for Chronology of Bishops) ^{[self-published]}
- Cheney, David M. "Diocese of Popayán". Catholic-Hierarchy.org. (for Chronology of Bishops) ^{[self-published]}
- Chow, Gabriel. "Metropolitan Diocese of Popayán (Colombia)". GCatholic.org. (for Chronology of Bishops) ^{[self-published]}
- Cheney, David M. "Archdiocese of Sucre". Catholic-Hierarchy.org. (for Chronology of Bishops) ^{[self-published]}
- Chow, Gabriel. "Metropolitan Archdiocese of Sucre (Bolivia)". GCatholic.org. (for Chronology of Bishops) ^{[self-published]}
- Cheney, David M. "Archdiocese of Lima". Catholic-Hierarchy.org. (for Chronology of Bishops) ^{[self-published]}
- Chow, Gabriel. "Metropolitan Archdiocese of Lima (Peru)". GCatholic.org. (for Chronology of Bishops) ^{[self-published]}

Government offices
Preceded by Diego de Villalba y Toledo	Governor general of the New Kingdom of Granada; 1671–1674	Succeeded by Francisco Castillo de la Concha
Preceded by Baltasar de la Cueva Enríquez	Viceroy of Peru; 1678–1681	Succeeded by Melchor de Navarra y Rocafull

Catholic Church titles
Preceded by Francisco de la Trinidad Arrieta	Bishop of Santa Marta; 1664–1668	Succeeded by Lucas Fernández de Piedrahita
Preceded by Vasco Jacinto de Contreras y Valverde	Bishop of Popayán; 1667–1672	Succeeded by Cristóbal Bernardo de Quiros
Preceded by Bernardo de Izaguirre de los Reyes	Archbishop of La Plata o Charcas; 1672–1675	Succeeded by Cristóbal de Castilla y Zamora
Preceded by Juan de Almoguera	Archbishop of Lima; 1677–1708	Succeeded by Antonio de Zuloagas
