= List of Catholic dioceses in Bolivia =

The Roman Catholic Church in Bolivia comprises four ecclesiastical provinces each headed by an archbishop. The provinces are in turn subdivided into 6 dioceses and 4 archdioceses each headed by a bishop or an archbishop. There are also 5 Apostolic Vicariates and one Military Ordinariate in Bolivia.

== List of Dioceses ==
=== Ecclesiastical province of Cochabamba ===
- Archdiocese of Cochabamba
  - Diocese of Oruro
  - Prelature of Aiquille

=== Ecclesiastical province of La Paz ===
- Archdiocese of La Paz
  - Diocese of Coroico
  - Diocese of El Alto
  - Prelature of Corocoro

=== Ecclesiastical province of Santa Cruz de la Sierra ===
- Archdiocese of Santa Cruz de la Sierra
  - Diocese of San Ignacio de Velasco

=== Ecclesiastical province of Sucre ===
- Archdiocese of Sucre
  - Diocese of Potosí
  - Diocese of Tarija

=== Sui iuris Jurisdictions ===
- Military Ordinariate of Bolivia
- Apostolic Vicariate of Camiri
- Apostolic Vicariate of El Beni
- Apostolic Vicariate of Ñuflo de Chávez
- Apostolic Vicariate of Pando
- Apostolic Vicariate of Reyes
