= Melchor Terrazas =

Bolivian politician and statesman

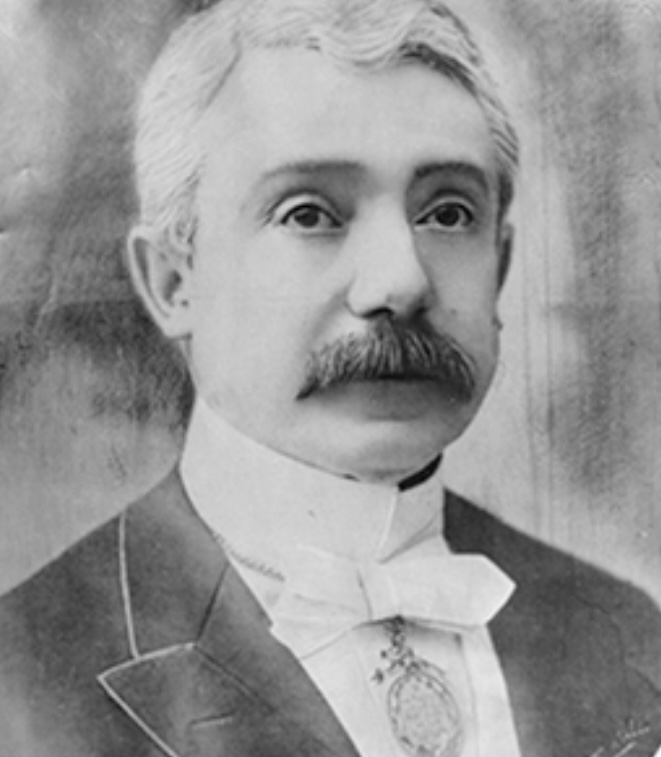

Minister of Justice, Public Instruction, and Worship
- In office 22 October 1871 – 27 January 1873
- President: Agustín Morales; Tomás Frías
- Preceded by: Manuel José Ribera
- Succeeded by: Juan de Dios Bosque

Minister of Government and Foreign Affairs
- In office 27 January 1873 – 9 May 1873
- President: Tomás Frías
- Preceded by: Casimiro Corral
- Succeeded by: Mariano Baptista

Personal details
- Born: June 6, 1825 Cochabamba, Bolivia
- Died: November 3, 1898 Cochabamba, Bolivia
- Spouse: María Manuela Benigna Urquidi Aguilar
- Relations: Manuel Terrazas; Hernán Terrazas Céspedes; David Terrazas Villegas
- Children: 11
- Parent(s): Pedro Pablo Terrazas Villanueva; Micaela Petrona Virreira Lopez
- Education: University of San Francisco Xavier
- Occupation: Lawyer, educator, politician

Melchor Terrazas Virreira (6 June 1825 – 3 November 1898) was a Bolivian politician and statesman who served as Minister of Government and Foreign Affairs and also as Minister of Justice, Public Instruction, and Worship during the presidencies of Tomás Frías and Agustín Morales. A lawyer and educator, he was an advocate for democratic, civilian governments and opposed caudillismo.

== Early life ==
Terrazas was born in Cochabamba, Bolivia, on June 6, 1825, the son of Pedro Pablo Terrazas Villanueva and Micaela Petrona Virreira López. He belonged to a family of wealthy landowners, allowing him to travel abroad in his youth and study at the then prestigious University of San Francisco Xavier.

== Educator and politician ==
A lawyer by 1850, Terrazas began working at the Higher University of San Simón in 1852. By 1855, he was Vice-Chancellor at the university and had earned acclaim across Bolivia for his administrative capabilities.

He began his political career in 1857, when he officially joined the linarista movement of the civilian caudillo José María Linares. The overthrow of Jorge Córdova that year facilitated the rise of Linares to the presidency. Despite his early support for Linares, Terrazas soon found himself alienated for his critical views on the policies of the new president. Twice Terrazas was twice exiled during the Linares administration.

In 1860, Terrazas returned from Chile and upon his entry to the city of Cochabamba, denounced the presidency of Linares, who had by then declared himself dictator. The uprising in Cochabamba was a violent one as the garrison loyal to Linares resisted. On November 2, 1860, the garrison was defeated and Terrazas proclaimed the rule of José María de Achá in Cochabamba.

Despite his leading role in the overthrow of Linares, Terrazas was prohibited from returning to the public sphere, although he was able to become Chancellor at the Higher University of San Simón. Achá was particularly unpopular among the scholarly elite, a fact which was reflected when most of the country's foremost educators, including Terrazas, rose in rebellion against the President in 1864. After months of turmoil, Manuel Isidoro Belzu had seized power, counting on the support of Terrazas.

However, days after his entry to La Paz, Belzu was assassinated by Mariano Melgarejo, who had launched a counter-coup against the belcistas. Terrazas decried the barbaric Melgarejo and fled to Peru. For the majority of Melgarejo's presidency, Terrazas was away from Bolivia. In 1870, Terrazas heard of the revolution against Melgarejo and immediately left Puno for La Paz. Arriving in December, Terrazas joined the cause of General Morales, who ousted Melgarejo after he had defeated General José María Calderón.

Once Morales became president, he formed the new Ministry of Justice, giving the portfolio to Terrazas on October 22, 1871. Terrazas was one of the many politicians alienated when Morales closed the National Assembly on November 25, 1872. With most politicians expecting an impending coup, Morales was assassinated in the early hours of November 27. Despite the death of Morales, Tomás Frías maintained the cabinet intact awaiting for the upcoming elections.

On January 27, 1873, Frías appointed Terrazas as Minister of Government and Foreign Affairs, a position he held until May 9, 1873, when Adolfo Ballivián was elected president.

Terrazas continued his political and diplomatic career, serving as the Bolivian ambassador to Peru during the War of the Pacific, where he engaged in talks with the Peruvians about a possible federal union between the two Andean states.

== Marriage and family ==
Terrazas married María Manuela Benigna Urquidi Aguilar on July 16, 1848. The couple had eleven children: Melchor Fidel, Benigna, Melchor, Josefa Gavina, Pablo José, Guillermo, José Manuel, Carmen, María Teresa, María Alvina, and Benigno. He is a relative of Manuel Terrazas, Hernán Terrazas Céspedes, and David Terrazas.
