= Berriz (disambiguation) =

Berriz is a town and municipality in the province of Biscay, Basque Country, northern Spain.

It may also refer to:

People:

- Elicio Berriz (1820–1890), Spanish soldier and Mayor of Ponce, Puerto Rico
- Juan de los Ríos y Berriz (1631–1698), Peruvian Roman Catholic prelate
- Martín Ruiz de Gamboa de Berriz (1533–1590), Spanish Basque conquistador

Others:

- Berriz, a K-pop fan platform launched by Kakao Entertainment in 2025
