= Pedro Cárdenas =

Pedro Cárdenas may refer to:

- Pedro Cárdenas y Arbieto (1640–1687), prelate of the Roman Catholic Church in South America
- Pedro Cárdenas Avendaño (1878–1965), Chilean journalist and politician
- Pedro Cárdenas Núñez (1891–1952), Chilean politician
