= Juan de Arguinao =

Prelate of the Catholic Church

The Most Reverend Juan de Arguinao y Gutiérrez, OP
- Archbishop of Santafé en Nueva Granada
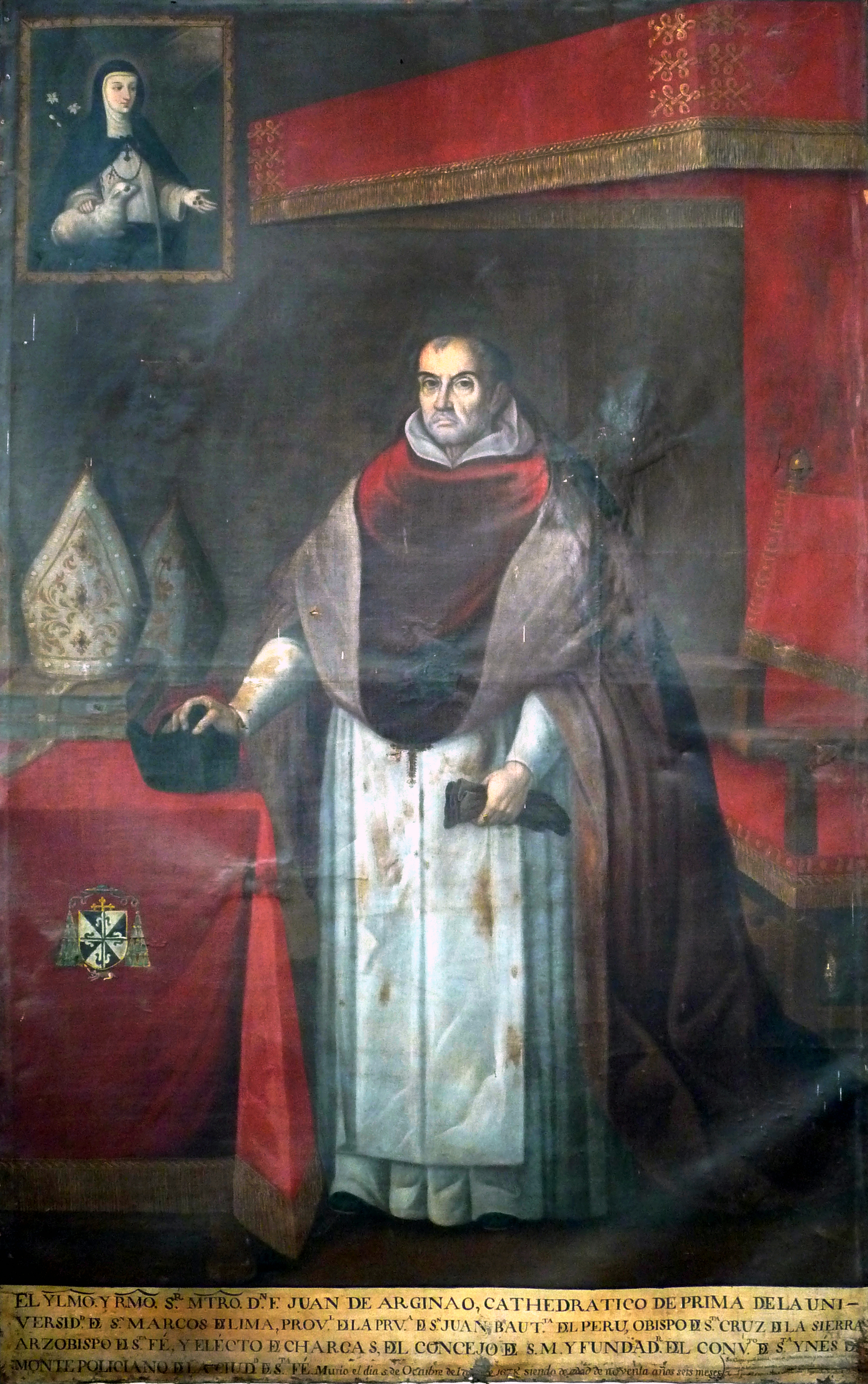
- Church: Catholic Church
- Archdiocese: Santafé en Nueva Granada
- Province: Santafé en Nueva Granada
- Appointed: 10 July 1659
- Installed: 10 November 1659
- Term ended: 5 October 1678
- Predecessor: Cristóbal de Torres, OP
- Successor: Antonio Sanz Lozano
- Previous post: Bishop of Santa Cruz de la Sierra (1646–1659)

Orders
- Consecration: 17 November 1647 by Pedro de Villagómez Vivanco

Personal details
- Born: April 1588 Lima, Viceroyalty of Peru
- Died: 5 October 1678 (aged 90) Bogotá, Viceroyalty of Peru

Juan de Dios de Arguinao y Gutiérrez, OP (April 1588 – 5 October 1678) was a prelate of the Catholic Church in the Viceroyalty of Peru. He served as bishop of Santa Cruz de la Sierra from 1646 to 1659, and as archbishop of Santafé in Nueva Granada (now Bogotá) from 1659 until his death in 1678.

== Biography ==
Arguinao y Gutiérrez was born in Lima, Viceroyalty of Peru, in April 1588. He joined the Dominican Order and was ordained a priest.

On 10 September 1646, Pope Innocent X appointed Arguinao bishop of Santa Cruz de la Sierra in what is now Bolivia. He was consecrated bishop on 17 November 1647 by Pedro de Villagómez Vivanco, the archbishop of Lima. He served there until 1659, when he became archbishop of Santafé en Nueva Granada (now the Archdiocese of Bogotá in what is now Colombia). He was selected to that position on 10 July 1659, and was confirmed on 10 November of that year.

Arguinao served as archbishop until his death on 5 October 1678, in Bogotá, at the age of 90.

== Episcopal lineage ==
- Bishop Diego de Romano y Govea (1578)
- Archbishop Bartolomé Lobo Guerrero (1597)
- Archbishop Hernando de Arias y Ugarte (1614)
- Archbishop Pedro de Villagómez Vivanco (1633)
- Archbishop Juan de Arguinao y Gutiérrez (1647)

== External links and additional sources ==
- Cheney, David M. "Archdiocese of Santa Cruz de la Sierra". Catholic-Hierarchy.org. (for Chronology of Bishops) ^{[self-published]}
- Chow, Gabriel. "Metropolitan Archdiocese of Santa Cruz de la Sierra". GCatholic.org. (for Chronology of Bishops) ^{[self-published]}
- Cheney, David M. "Archdiocese of Bogotá". Catholic-Hierarchy.org. (for Chronology of Bishops) ^{[self-published]}
- Chow, Gabriel. "Metropolitan Archdiocese of Bogotá (Colombia)". GCatholic.org. (for Chronology of Bishops) ^{[self-published]}

Catholic Church titles
Preceded by Juan de Zapata y Figueroa	Bishop of Santa Cruz de la Sierra; 1646–1659	Succeeded by Juan de Ribera
Preceded by Cristóbal de Torres	Archbishop of Santafé en Nueva Granada; 1659–1678	Succeeded by Antonio Sanz Lozano
