= Charles Arthur Brown =

Catholic bishop in Bolivia

The Most Reverend Charles A. Brown, M.M.
- Auxiliary Bishop of Santa Cruz
- Church: Catholic Church
- See: Titular See of Vallis
- Appointed: November 29, 1956
- In office: February 27, 1957 - August 1995

Orders
- Ordination: June 9, 1946
- Consecration: February 27, 1957 by Francis Spellman

Personal details
- Born: August 20, 1919 Bronx, New York
- Died: May 14, 1997 (aged 77) Tarrytown, New York
- Motto: Facere Voluntatem Tuam (To Do Thy Will)

Charles Arthur Brown, M.M. (August 20, 1919 – May 14, 1997) was an American-born Catholic missionary and bishop. As a member of the Catholic Foreign Mission Society of America (Maryknoll) he was assigned to missions in Bolivia. He served as the Auxiliary Bishop of the Archdiocese of Santa Cruz from 1957 to 1997.

== Early life and education ==
Charles Brown was born in the Highbridge section of the Bronx, New York, to James and Mary Jane (Sullivan) Brown and was one of 11 children. He was educated at Sacred Heart School and Cathedral College, a minor seminary for the Archdiocese of New York. He entered Maryknoll following graduation and entered Venard Apostolic College in Clarks Summit, Pennsylvania. He completed his studies for the priesthood at Maryknoll Seminary in New York before being ordained a priest on June 9, 1946.

== Priesthood ==
Brown spent his entire career in the Maryknoll Mission in Bolivia. He did pastoral work in Cochabamba before being the named the National Director of Vocations by the Bolivian bishops in 1953. In the fall of the same year, he became pastor at St. Peter's parish in La Paz. Brown also held Maryknoll leadership positions in South America.

== Episcopacy ==
Pope Pius XII appointed Brown as the Titular Bishop of Vallis and Auxiliary Bishop of Santa Cruz on November 29, 1956. He was consecrated a bishop by Cardinal Francis Spellman at St. Patrick’s Cathedral in New York on February 27, 1957. The principal co-consecrators were New York Auxiliary Bishop Joseph Flannelly and Coadjutor Bishop Luis Aníbal Rodríguez Pardo of Santa Cruz. He attended all four sessions of the Second Vatican Council (1962–1965). He served the diocese, and later, Archdiocese of Santa Cruz as vicar general and helped to organize a pre-seminary. He remained as the auxiliary bishop until his resignation was accepted by Pope John Paul II in August 1995.

== Later life and death ==
Bishop Brown continued to reside in Santa Cruz, but because his health was declining he was only able to provide limited ministry. He went to Rome in 1996 at the invitation of Pope John Paul II to celebrate a special Golden Jubilee Mass of thanksgiving at St. Peter’s Basilica for all priests, who like the pope, were ordained in 1946. Brown was unable to take part in the Mass as he was taken ill. His need for medical treatment became more urgent upon his return to Santa Cruz and he returned to New York. He was treated at New York University Medical Center before moving to St. Teresa’s Residence at Maryknoll. He spent a few days there before he was hospitalized again and he died on May 14, 1997, at Phelps Memorial Hospital in Tarrytown, New York. His funeral was celebrated by Cardinal John O'Connor of New York at Our Lady Queen of Apostles Chapel in the Maryknoll Center. He had another funeral in Santa Cruz and was laid to rest in the Cathedral-Basilica of San Lorenzo.
