= Juan de Ribera (bishop of Santa Cruz de la Sierra) =

Most Reverend Juan de Ribera
- Bishop of Santa Cruz de la Sierra
- Church: Catholic Church
- Diocese: Diocese of Santa Cruz de la Sierra
- In office: 1659–1666
- Predecessor: Juan de Arguinao y Gutiérrez
- Successor: Bernardino de Cárdenas Ponce

Orders
- Consecration: 1660

Personal details
- Born: 1588 Pisco, Peru
- Died: 1666 (age 78) Santa Cruz de la Sierra, Bolivia

Juan de Ribera, O.S.A. (1588-1666) was a Roman Catholic prelate who served as Bishop of Santa Cruz de la Sierra (1659–1666).

== Biography ==
Juan de Ribera was born in Pisco, Peru and ordained a priest in the Order of Saint Augustine. On November 17, 1659, he was selected by the King of Spain and confirmed by Pope Paul V as Bishop of Santa Cruz de la Sierra. In 1660, he was consecrated bishop and succeeded to the bishopric. He served as Bishop of Santa Cruz de la Sierra until his death in 1666.

== External links and additional sources ==
- Cheney, David M. "Archdiocese of Santa Cruz de la Sierra". Catholic-Hierarchy.org. (for Chronology of Bishops) ^{[self-published]}
- Chow, Gabriel. "Metropolitan Archdiocese of Santa Cruz de la Sierra". GCatholic.org. (for Chronology of Bishops) ^{[self-published]}

Catholic Church titles
Preceded by Juan de Arguinao y Gutiérrez	Bishop of Santa Cruz de la Sierra; 1659–1666	Succeeded by Bernardino de Cárdenas Ponce
