= Antonio de Zuloaga =

18th-century Roman Catholic archbishop

Most Reverend Antonio de Zuloaga
- Archbishop of Lima
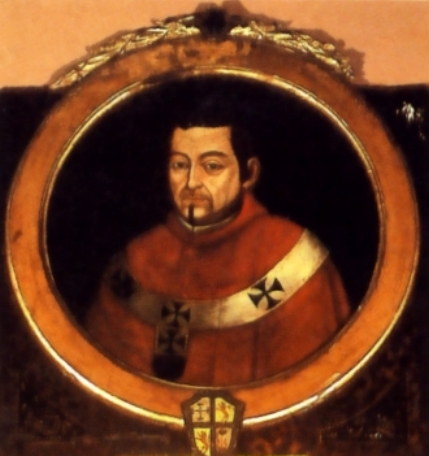
- Church: Catholic Church
- Diocese: Archdiocese of Lima
- In office: 1713–1722
- Predecessor: Melchor de Liñán y Cisneros
- Successor: Diego Morcillo Rubio de Auñón de Robledo

Orders
- Consecration: 14 Apr 1715 by Francisco Cisneros y Mendoza

Personal details
- Died: 21 January 1722 Lima, Peru

Antonio de Zuloaga or Antonio de Soloaga (Latin: Antonius Zuloaga) (died 21 Jan 1722) was a Roman Catholic prelate who served as Archbishop of Lima (1713–1722).

== Biography ==
On 11 Dec 1713, Antonio de Zuloaga was appointed during the papacy of Pope Clement XI as Archbishop of Lima. On 14 Apr 1715, he was consecrated bishop by Francisco Cisneros y Mendoza, Titular Bishop of Mactaris. He served as Archbishop of Lima until his death on 21 Jan 1722.

While bishop, he was the principal consecrator of Alejo Fernando de Rojas y Acevedo, Bishop of Santiago de Chile (1718).

== External links and additional sources ==
- Cheney, David M. "Archdiocese of Lima". Catholic-Hierarchy.org. (for Chronology of Bishops) ^{[self-published]}
- Chow, Gabriel. "Metropolitan Archdiocese of Lima (Peru)". GCatholic.org. (for Chronology of Bishops) ^{[self-published]}

Catholic Church titles
Preceded by Melchor de Liñán y Cisneros	Archbishop of Lima; 1713–1722	Succeeded by Diego Morcillo Rubio de Auñón de Robledo
