= Juan de Esturizada =

Most Reverend Juan de Esturizada
- Bishop of Santa Cruz de la Sierra
- Church: Catholic Church
- Diocese: Diocese of Santa Cruz de la Sierra
- In office: 1672–1679
- Predecessor: Bernardino de Cárdenas Ponce
- Successor: Pedro Cárdenas y Arbieto

Personal details
- Born: 1611 Cusco, Peru
- Died: 1679 (age 68) Santa Cruz de la Sierra, Bolivia

Juan de Esturizada, O.P. (1611–1679) was a Roman Catholic prelate who served as Bishop of Santa Cruz de la Sierra (1672–1679).

He was born in Cusco, Peru and ordained a priest in the Order of Preachers. On May 16, 1672, he was selected by the King of Spain and confirmed by Pope Clement X as Bishop of Santa Cruz de la Sierra. He served as Bishop of Santa Cruz de la Sierra until his death in 1679.

== External links and additional sources ==
- Cheney, David M. "Archdiocese of Santa Cruz de la Sierra". Catholic-Hierarchy.org. (for Chronology of Bishops) ^{[self-published]}
- Chow, Gabriel. "Metropolitan Archdiocese of Santa Cruz de la Sierra". GCatholic.org. (for Chronology of Bishops) ^{[self-published]}

Catholic Church titles
| Preceded by Bernardino de Cárdenas Ponce | Bishop of Santa Cruz de la Sierra; 1672–1679 | Succeeded by Pedro Cárdenas y Arbieto |
