= Carlos Manuel de Villegas =

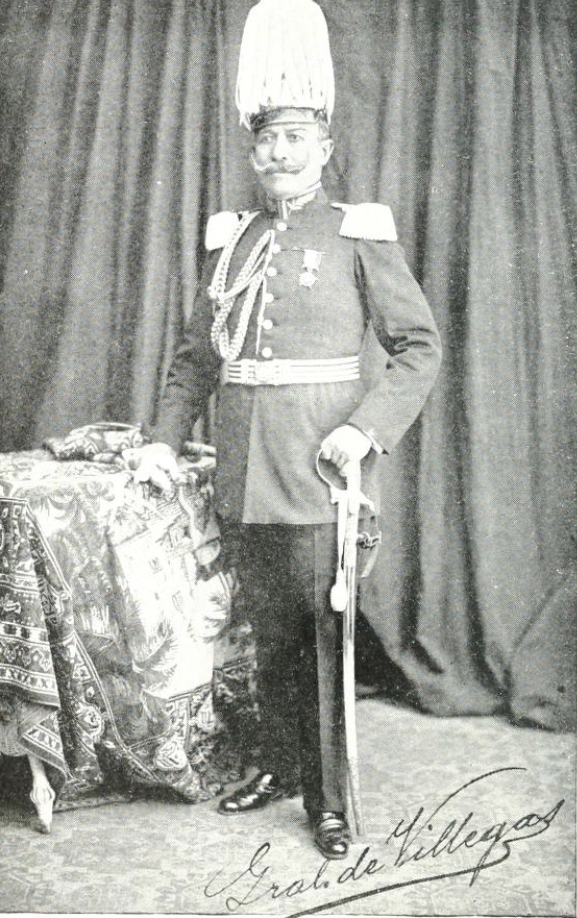

Personal details
- Born: December 25, 1862 La Paz, Bolivia
- Died: July 30, 1944 La Paz, Bolivia
- Party: Liberal Party
- Spouse: Beatriz Virreira
- Relations: David Terrazas Villegas (grandson)
- Children: 4
- Occupation: Military officer

Military service
- Branch/service: Bolivian Army
- Years of service: 1879–1922
- Rank: Brigadier general
- Battles/wars: War of the Pacific; Bolivian Civil War

Carlos Manuel de Villegas (25 December 1862 – 30 July 1944) was a Bolivian military officer and veteran of the War of the Pacific. He was influential during the Bolivian Civil War of 1898–1899, siding with the Liberals and serving under José Manuel Pando. He held various positions in the Bolivian Army and had an unceremonious end to his career after accusations of treason were spread by his detractors. He was the son of General Carlos de Villegas, a Bolivian Minister of War.

== Early life and the War of the Pacific ==
The son of General Carlos de Villegas and Belizenda Constanza Ribera, Villegas was born in the city of La Paz on December 25, 1862. At the age of 17, he obtained a bachelor's degree in Letters, Philosophy, and Humanities in 1877. Two years later, the War of the Pacific ignited. Villegas decided to join the army and enlisted in the ranks of the "Chorolque" battalion in Potosí, part of the Fifth Division, which left Cotagaita on October 11, 1879, under the command of General Narciso Campero. Promoted to sublieutenant standard-bearer on May 2, 1880, he had his baptism of fire in the Battle of el Alto de la Alianza, where he fought until he was seriously wounded and captured. Taken prisoner and interned in the Chilean town of San Bernardo, he remained captive until the end of 1881, when he was able to return to his homeland, promoted to first lieutenant on October 20, 1883.

== Military career ==
He continued his military career until 1888 when, due to the revolution of September 8 in Sucre against President Aniceto Arce, he was forced to retired with the rank of sergeant major. With the federal revolution of 1898, Villegas took part in it and fought in the Battle of Segundo Crucero on April 10, 1899, with the rank of commander. For his bravery in combat, he was promoted to lieutenant colonel on July 10 of the same year.

Promoted to colonel on August 26, 1905, he was appointed Deputy Chief of the General Staff in December of the same year. When the editorial board of the "Military Magazine" was organized in January 1907, he became one of its most frequent contributors. At the end of that year, he traveled to Chaco as a Special Commissioner of the Government. Upon his return, he held important positions such as Military Attaché in Argentina, Director of the Military College, and Prefect of Oruro. In 1909, he was appointed Adjutant General of the Ministry of War and later traveled as the Chief of the Military Commission sent to Chile when that republic celebrated its centenary of independence. The Chilean government awarded him the medal of merit. Back in Bolivia, he was appointed acting Chief of the General Staff, a position he held until January 1911, when he became a member of the Supreme War Council. From January 1916 to 1921, he held various important military positions, including Inspector General of the Army, Chief of the Military Zone of the Military Subdelegate in the Gran Chaco, President of the Supreme War Council, and Chief of the General Staff.

== Retirement and death ==
While in this position, he was accused by the La Paz press of treason against the country for: "revealing secrets related to the organization of the army and delivering a copy of the war budget to the Chilean military attaché in the early days of April 1920". As a result, he was subject to a trial, and the Supreme War Council issued an indictment on October 4, 1921. However, Villegas was able to prove his innocence during the trial and was acquitted by a general order that stated: "By a ruling on August 24, 1922, the Supreme War Council has, under Article 261 of the Code of Military Procedures, acquitted General Villegas".

These incidents that tarnished his reputation led Villegas to decide to retire from the military career, requesting his retirement, which was granted by supreme decree on November 15, 1922, recognizing 40 years and 10 months of military service to the nation. In 1918, the Senate granted him the use of the medal awarded to Pacific War veterans in 1879.

== Marriage and family ==
Villegas married Beatriz Virreira, a native of Cochabamba, on September 8, 1881. They had the following children:

- Carlos Pedro (3 May 1883 – 8 August 1966); married to Clotilde Rivas and had three children.
- Beatriz (8 June 1884 – 19 November 1956); married to Julián Terrazas Antezana and the mother of David Terrazas Villegas.
- Antonio Manuel (19 December 1885 – 4 August 1933); married to Juana Manuela Medinaceli and had seven children.
- Gregorio (26 February 1887 – 21 January 1980); married to firstly to Corina Arana and secondly to Julieta Casta Aguirre. He fathered eleven children by both marriages.
