= Francisco Cisneros y Mendoza =

Most Reverend Francisco Cisneros y Mendoza
- Auxiliary Bishop of Lima
- Church: Catholic Church
- Archdiocese: Archdiocese of Lima
- In office: 1702–1724

Orders
- Consecration: November 1703 by Melchor Liñán y Cisneros

Personal details
- Born: 1644 Lima, Peru
- Died: 1724 (age 80) Lima, Peru

Francisco Cisneros y Mendoza (1644–1724) was a Roman Catholic prelate who served as Auxiliary Bishop of Lima (1702–1724) and Titular Bishop of Mactaris (1702–1724).

== Biography ==
Francisco Cisneros y Mendoza was born in 1644 in Lima, Peru. On June 12, 1702, he was selected by the King of Spain and confirmed by Pope Clement XI as Auxiliary Bishop of Lima and Titular Bishop of Mactaris. in November 1703, he was consecrated bishop by Melchor Liñán y Cisneros, Archbishop of Lima. He served as Auxiliary Bishop of Lima until his death in 1724.

While bishop, he was the principal consecrator of Nicolás Urbán de Mota y Haro, Bishop of La Paz (1703); Diego Montero del Aguila, Bishop of Concepción (1710); and Antonio de Zuloaga, Archbishop of Lima (1715).

== External links and additional sources ==
- Cheney, David M. "Archdiocese of Lima". Catholic-Hierarchy.org. (for Chronology of Bishops) ^{[self-published]}
- Chow, Gabriel. "Metropolitan Archdiocese of Lima (Peru)". GCatholic.org. (for Chronology of Bishops) ^{[self-published]}
- Cheney, David M. "Mactaris (Titular See)". Catholic-Hierarchy.org. (for Chronology of Bishops) ^{[self-published]}
- Chow, Gabriel. "Titular Episcopal See of Mactaris (Tunisia)". GCatholic.org. (for Chronology of Bishops) ^{[self-published]}

Catholic Church titles
Preceded by	Auxiliary Bishop of Lima; 1702–1724	Succeeded by
Preceded by Stanisław Domaniewski	Titular Bishop of Mactaris; 1702–1724	Succeeded by Franciscus Szembek
