= Pedro Vásquez de Velasco =

Most Reverend Pedro Vásquez de Velasco
- Bishop of Santa Cruz de la Sierra
- Church: Catholic Church
- Diocese: Diocese of Santa Cruz de la Sierra
- In office: 1706–1714
- Predecessor: Juan Francisco de Padilla y San Martín
- Successor: Jaime de Mimbela

Orders
- Consecration: 1706 by Melchor Liñán y Cisneros

Personal details
- Born: 1657 Lima, Peru
- Died: February 26, 1714 (age 57) Santa Cruz de la Sierra, Bolivia

Pedro Vásquez de Velasco (1657–1714) was a Roman Catholic prelate who was Bishop of Santa Cruz de la Sierra (1706–1714).

== Biography ==
Pedro Vásquez de Velasco was born in Lima, Peru. On February 22, 1706, he was selected by the King of Spain and confirmed by Pope Innocent XI as Bishop of Santa Cruz de la Sierra. In 1706, he was consecrated bishop by Melchor Liñán y Cisneros, Archbishop of Lima. He was Bishop of Santa Cruz de la Sierra until his death on February 26, 1714. While Bishop, he was the principal co-consecrator of Luis Francisco Romero, Bishop of Santiago de Chile.

== External links and additional sources ==
- Cheney, David M. "Archdiocese of Santa Cruz de la Sierra". Catholic-Hierarchy.org. (for chronology of Bishops) ^{[self-published]}
- Chow, Gabriel. "Metropolitan Archdiocese of Santa Cruz de la Sierra". GCatholic.org. (for chronology of Bishops) ^{[self-published]}

Religious titles
Preceded by Juan Francisco de Padilla y San Martín	Bishop of Santa Cruz de la Sierra; 1706–1714	Succeeded by Jaime de Mimbela
