= Sergio Alfredo Gualberti Calandrina =

Italian-born prelate

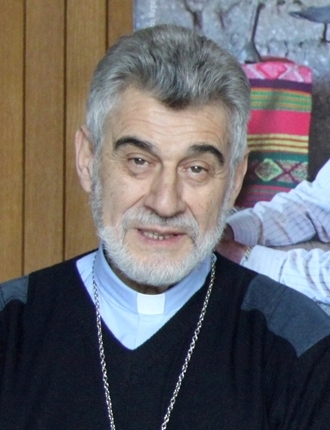
Sergio Alfredo Gualberti (2012)

Sergio Alfredo Gualberti Calandrina (born 8 November 1945) is an Italian-born prelate of the Catholic Church who has been the Archbishop of Santa Cruz de la Sierra, Bolivia, since 2013. He has worked in Bolivia since 1979.

== Biography ==
Sergio Alfredo Gualberti Calandrina was born in Clusone, Province of Bergamo, on 8 November 1945. He entered the Diocesan Seminary of Bergamo in 1956 and was ordained a priest on 26 June 1971.

From 1971 to 1979 he served as chaplain to Italian migrants in Neuchâtel, Switzerland. He began his work in Bolivia in November 1979 as vicar and then parish priest of "El Salvador" parish in La Paz from 1981 to 1987. In 1985 he was appointed Councilor of the National Lay Council. In 1987 he became National Councilor of the Basic Ecclesial Communities while working as well at the "Nuestra Señora de Copacabana" parish in La Paz. In April 1990, the Bolivian Episcopal Conference (BEC) appointed him Secretary for Pastoral Care. On 16 March 1996, he was elected Deputy General Secretary of the BEC. He was President of the Commission of Missions of the BEC and then first Councilor of its Evangelization Division.

On 6 May 1999, Pope Benedict XVI named him Auxiliary Bishop of Santa Cruz de la Sierra. He received his episcopal consecration from Cardinal Julio Terrazas Sandoval on 22 July. Pope Benedict named him Archbishop Coadjutor on 28 September 2011 and he succeeded as Archbishop when Pope Benedict accepted Sandoval's resignation on 25 May 2013.

He was a participant in the Synod of Bishops for the Pan-Amazon region in 2019. He was one of four Synod prelates elected on 7 October to the thirteen-person committee to prepare the Synod's concluding document. (Note: Five other members are synod officials who serve ex offico and four are named by Pope Francis.)
