= Juan Francisco de Padilla y San Martín =

Catholic bishop in 17th century

Most Reverend Juan Francisco de Padilla y San Martín
- Bishop of Santa Cruz de la Sierra
- Church: Catholic Church
- Diocese: Diocese of Santa Cruz de la Sierra
- In office: 1699–1700
- Predecessor: Juan de los Ríos y Berriz
- Successor: Pedro Vásquez de Velasco
- Previous post: Bishop of Puerto Rico (1683–1699)

Orders
- Consecration: 1684 by Cardinal Savio Millini

Personal details
- Born: August 16, 1646 Lima, Peru
- Died: 1700 (age 53) Santa Cruz de la Sierra, Bolivia

Juan Francisco de Padilla y San Martín, O. de M. (August 16, 1646 – 1700) was a Roman Catholic prelate who was Bishop of Santa Cruz de la Sierra (1699–1700) and Bishop of Puerto Rico (1683–1699).

== Biography ==
Juan Francisco de Padilla y San Martín was born in Lima, Peru. In 1666, he was ordained a priest in the Order of the Blessed Virgin Mary of Mercy. On May 22, 1683, he was selected by the King of Spain and confirmed on November 15, 1683, by Pope Innocent XI as Bishop of Puerto Rico. In 1684, he was consecrated Bishop by Savio Millini, Archbishop (Personal Title) of Orvieto. On June 1, 1699, he was selected by the King of Spain and confirmed by Pope Innocent XII as Bishop of Santa Cruz de la Sierra. He was Bishop of Santa Cruz de la Sierra until his death in 1700.

== External links and additional sources ==
- Cheney, David M. "Archdiocese of San Juan de Puerto Rico". Catholic-Hierarchy.org. (for Chronology of Bishops) ^{[self-published]}
- Chow, Gabriel. "Metropolitan Archdiocese of San Juan de Puerto Rico". Gcatholic. (for Chronology of Bishops) ^{[self-published]}
- Cheney, David M. "Archdiocese of Santa Cruz de la Sierra". Catholic-Hierarchy.org. (for Chronology of Bishops) ^{[self-published]}
- Chow, Gabriel. "Metropolitan Archdiocese of Santa Cruz de la Sierra". GCatholic.org. (for Chronology of Bishops) ^{[self-published]}

Religious titles
Preceded by Marcos de Sobremonte	Bishop of Puerto Rico; 1683–1699	Succeeded by Jerónimo Nosti de Valdés
Preceded by Juan de los Ríos y Berriz	Bishop of Santa Cruz de la Sierra; 1699–1700	Succeeded by Pedro Vásquez de Velasco
