= Carlos de Villegas =

19th-century Bolivian military leader

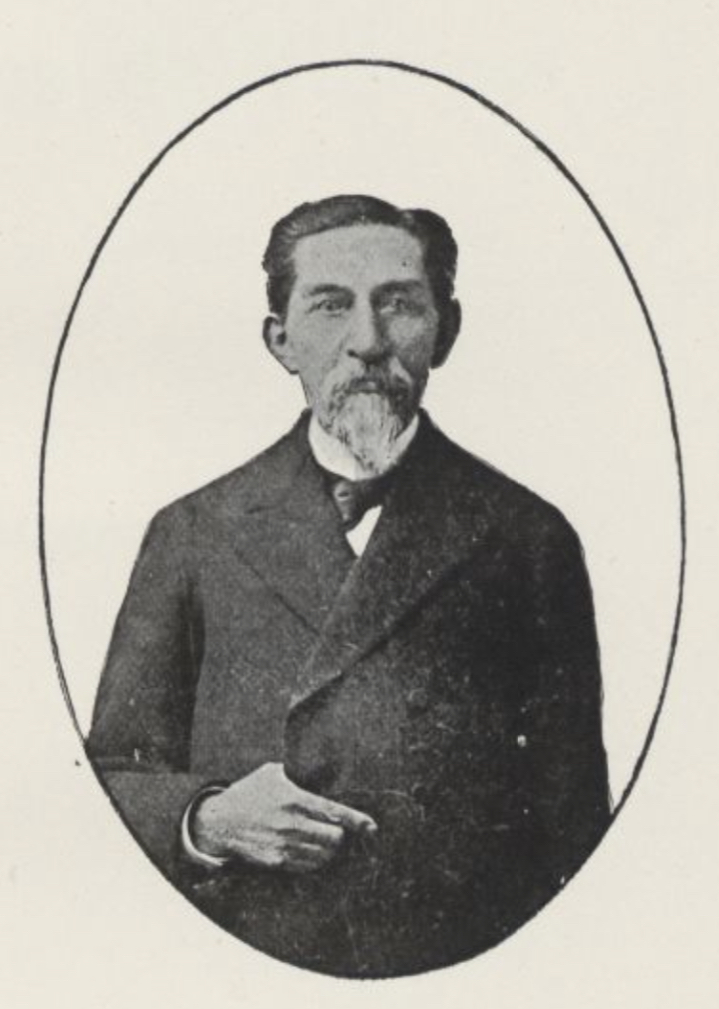

Minister of War
- In office 28 October 1876 – 7 May 1878
- President: Hilarión Daza
- Preceded by: Agustín Aspiazu
- Succeeded by: Benjamin Lens

Personal details
- Born: March 1, 1824 San Antonio de Morayo, Bolivia
- Died: January 7, 1897 (aged 72) La Paz, Bolivia
- Resting place: General Cemetery of La Paz
- Spouse: Belizenda Constanza Ribera
- Children: 6
- Parent(s): José Fausto de Villegas; Agustina Aramayo
- Occupation: Military officer
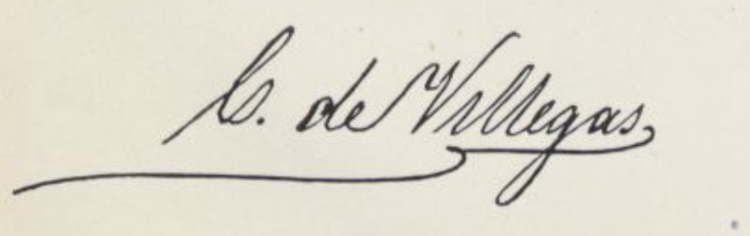
- Signature

Military service
- Branch/service: Bolivian Army
- Rank: Division general
- Battles/wars: War of the Confederation; Peruvian–Bolivian War of 1841–42; War of the Pacific

Carlos de Villegas (1 March 1824 – 7 January 1897) was a Bolivian military officer, statesman, and politician who served during the War of the Confederation, the Peruvian–Bolivian War of 1841–42, and the War of the Pacific. He was a noted war hero in Bolivia, serving in several posts throughout his lifetime, including as Minister of War. He was the father of Bolivian General Carlos Manuel de Villegas.

Starting his military career at a young age, Villegas spent a large part of his youth either fighting in international wars or in civil wars. He lived through the presidencies of Manuel Isidoro Belzu and José María Linares, times in which he took arms in favor of the current government in opposition to insurrections. However, he did favor the government of Linares, whom he supported and helped take power in 1857. Remaining loyal to Linares for most of his administration, once the dictator had lost most support and was betrayed by his Minister of War, José María de Achá, Villegas turned on his former benefactor.

Under Achá, Villegas flourished and ascended to the rank of general, occupying high positions in the military and government. However, he was exiled from Bolivia when Mariano Melgarejo took power in 1864. Joining the revolution against the aforementioned caudillo, Villegas joined the ranks of Agustín Morales and Tomás Frías in what seemed a sacrosanct cause to oust an unpopular tyrant. Despite his inclination to support Frías, he was unable to support the President when he was surrounded at the Palacio Quemado and forced to resign in 1876. Hilarión Daza, now President, appointed Villegas as Minister of War. During his tenure, he put down the violent uprising led by Andrés Ibañez, whom he knew personally.

Later, he had a significant role during the War of the Pacific, in which he was given command of a division. Seeing action against the Chileans at the Battle of San Francisco, he was wounded and captured. After the end of the war, he continued his political and military career, occupying several high posts in the last years of his life until his retirement in the early 1890s. His long career, both political and military, shed light onto a turbulent period of Bolivian history.

== Early life and military career ==
=== Birth and youth ===
Villegas was born in San Antonio de Morayo, Chichas Province, on March 1, 1824. His parents were José Fausto Villegas and Agustina Aramayo de Villegas. He spent his early years in that province, where he received a very limited education, as schools were scarce in those times and mainly located in the capitals. While still in his youth, driven by his adventurous character, he enlisted in the army and quickly distinguished himself. On April 22, 1838, he was promoted to cadet as a reward for his good conduct.

=== War of the Confederation and Ingavi ===
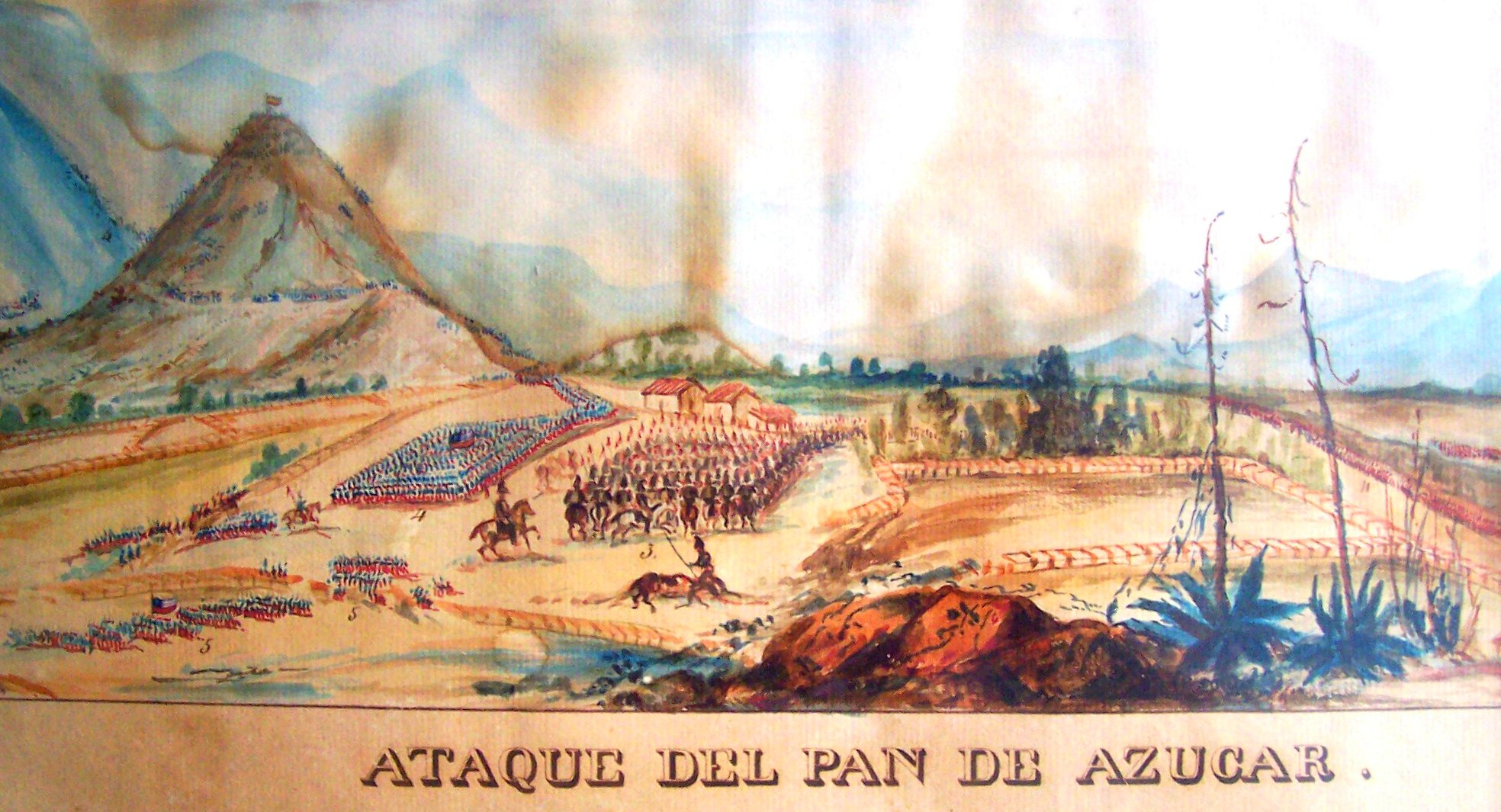
The attack on the Pan de Azucar during the Battle of Yungay. Villegas, although young, was present there.

As a cadet, he participated in the campaign of the Peru–Bolivian Confederation. Villegas stood out in the Battle of Buin on January 6, 1839, as well as in the Battle of Yungay, which took place in the same month and year. For his bravery and excellent behavior during this unsuccessful war for Bolivia, he received an honor medal for the 'Pacification of Peru'. Provisional President José Miguel de Velasco promoted the young cadet to the rank of ensign on May 20, 1839. Later, when Velasco was proclaimed constitutional president, Villegas was promoted again and received the rank of lieutenant on September 20, 1840. As a Lieutenant, he participated in the defensive campaign following Agustín Gamarra's invasion, led by General José Ballivián, contributing to the victory at Ingavi on November 18, 1841. After this victory, Villegas was promoted to the rank of captain by Provisional President Ballivián on November 21, 1841, just three days after the victory. At the same time, he was decorated with an honor medal and declared a "benefactor of the homeland in a heroic and eminent degree." Among those who marched to Peru after Ingavi was Villegas, staying in the neighboring nation until the treaties between Bolivia and Peru were concluded.

Villegas participated in several battles that would be significant in Bolivia's military history. In Iruya and Montenegro, the Bolivians defeated the Argentinians, and in Yanacocha and Ingavi, they defeated the Peruvians. Impressing his superiors in each of these actions, Villegas was considered an exemplary military officer. He was promoted to major on November 18, 1845, with his commissions signed by President Ballivián. He rose to the rank of commander on May 31, 1848, with his commissions signed by President Velasco. On October 18, 1848, he participated in the Battle of Quirpinchaca, and a few days later, on December 6, in the Battle of Yamparáez. In both encounters, Villegas defended Velasco's regime against the uprisings of leaders attempting to seize power from the aforementioned. General Manuel Isidoro Belzu managed to seize the presidency in the fields of Yamparáez. Supported by the lower classes of the population, to whom he showered favors, Belzu opposed the aristocrats of the country. Villegas joined Belzu's enemies and, throughout the time the belcista party governed, he remained among the insurgents, fighting in support of José María Linares. The civil war that unfolded in Bolivia during this period is one of the most tenacious and bloody in Bolivian history.

== Internal chaos ==
=== Conflict between belcistas and linaristas ===
==== Triumph of Linares and Villegas' death sentence ====
Belzu and Linares were the protagonists of this civil war. Bolivia was essentially a field of conspiracy or struggle; the educated and aristocratic part sided with Linares, while the popular masses with the artisans sided with Belzu. The conflict did not remain solely within Bolivia's borders. The borders, where those involved sought refuge, were also a theater of operations during this turbulent period. Belzu distrusted everyone, pitting the lower classes against the upper classes, attacking and humiliating those who, due to their wealth and family pride, formed the aristocracy. Linares had the support of university students and members of elite families, presenting himself determined to defeat caudillismo, investing all his fortune and that of his political allies in a cause considered sacred, and in whose triumph he and his supporters saw the regeneration of the homeland seemingly sunk in the mire. This idea gave rise to the name of the linarista Generator Party.

In the midst of this war, Linares granted promotions and ranks that were not truly valid because they did not emanate from an established or organized authority. However, they had a certain hope of being validated once the cause, which constantly gained popular sympathy, triumphed. Villegas was rewarded with the ranks of lieutenant colonel and colonel. But when Linares' cause triumphed and the ranks received during the struggle were confirmed, he submitted his resignation.

Despite his resignation, Linares and the Minister of War, Gregorio Perez, still conferred the ranks onto Villegas. Prior to Linares' triumph, Bolivia was governed by General Jorge Córdova, who was reputed to have a kind character for saving "so many victims from the gallows." However, as the successor of Belzu, his father-in-law, and following Belzu's policies and instructions, insurrection continued to simmer in Bolivia, and conspirators appeared increasingly resolved. Bolivia persisted just as Belzu had depicted it in an official document when he said: "Successive revolutions, revolutions in the South, revolutions in the North, revolutions fostered by my enemies, led by my friends, combined in my own abode... Holy God!... condemned me to a perpetual state of combat". Indeed, the political crisis was a bloody struggle between the government and the increasingly powerful public opinion in favor of Linares. Córdova was in La Paz after declaring amnesty on January 31, 1856, when it became known that a group of conspirators was actively working to disrupt order: "Based on a report made by two sergeants, Colonel Celada caught Colonel Villegas in the act of conspiracy against the government on March 4, along with other leaders, officers, and sergeants, proclaiming, as in previous uprisings, the presidency of Linares. Arrested and brought to trial, they were sentenced to capital punishment. However, guided by the characteristic clemency of General Córdova, the government commuted this sentence to imprisonment for eight of the conspirators. The remaining three, Colonel Villegas, Major Eduardo Dávalos, and Sergeant Manuel Angulo, were to be executed on March 8".

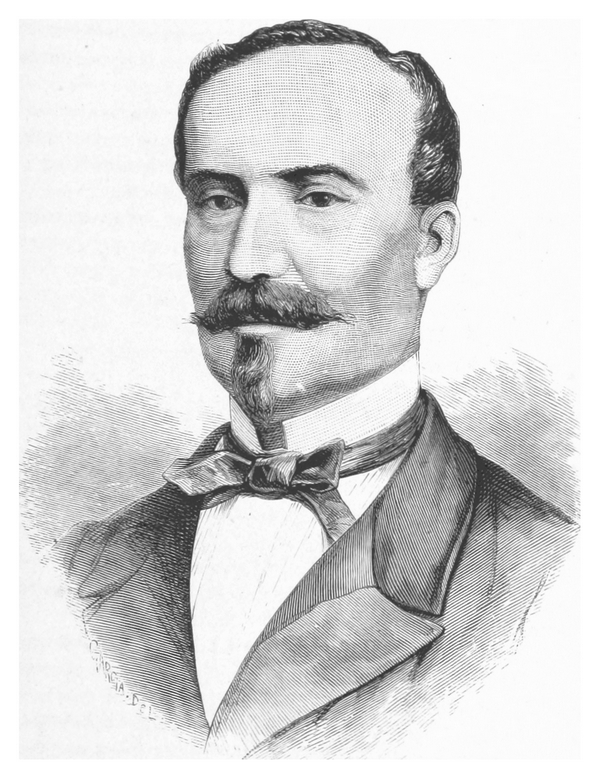
General Belzu's conflict with Linares allowed for Villegas to rise quickly within the ranks of the army. By 1858, he was already a colonel.

The people of La Paz were deeply perturbed and utilized every means at their disposal to save them. As the condemned approached the gallows, the tone of pleas changed to threats, reaching the point where the crowd armed themselves to prevent the execution. Two young Cochabamba citizens, Don Cupertino Méndez and Don Pedro Nernuldes, particularly stood out in this cause. The danger of a clash between the people and the armed forces was imminent. Córdova himself observed this scene from the palace balconies, where "the popular roar drowned out all other noise".

As was noted by Luis M. Guzmán in Historia de Bolivia, the events that transpired that day were almost commonplace in Bolivia. Although approving of the clemency shown, he still condemns the belcista party:

In the end, compassion triumphed over the severity of military laws. The condemned showed bravery and composure as they marched to the gallows. General Córdova, moved by these events, not only granted them pardon but had them brought to the palace; he embraced them and set them free. Such generosity should have been acknowledged and appreciated, but administrative aptitude does not originate from the sources of political sentimentality. Córdova was the continuation of a bastard government condemned by national opinion, and that illegitimacy was not purged by the noble impulses of an individual.

Another witness to those events said the following about Villegas' behavior throughout the ordeal:

I was assured that one of the most uncompromising linaristas supporters had been captured, and this was Colonel, still young, Carlos de Villegas. I had very good news about this military officer and wanted to verify the great personal courage that had been so praised to me. I put myself in observation, leveraging my position and connections. It is not uncommon among the Bolivian military for these bursts of courage that decide a battle... however, it has astonished me to see a young man, full of hopes, in the midst of a brilliant career, sentenced to death, calm and resolved, showing no desire to live, awaiting death as one awaits relief after a hot day in our Yungas, for the night to temper the heat of a summer sun. This is how I saw Villegas, through reports during his time in prison and during the journey to the gallows, proud, without affectation, calm without pretense; he had a very well-tempered soul, and perhaps that is why his philosophical ideas were daring and unshakable, as he demonstrated later.

==== Fall of Linares ====
The political landscape changed in Bolivia with the fall of Córdova and the rise of Linares. The disorganization of the branches of government and even social institutions was complete. Linares embarked on a path of reforms with the intention of modernizing the country but lacked the patience and prudence required for such consequential reforms. Unrest and conspiracies resumed, forcing Linares to declare himself a dictator to facilitate the enactment of his decrees. Because he punished those who resisted his government with extreme severity, he began to lose popularity until he was overthrown in a coup on January 14, 1861. During Linares' administration, Villegas, who had fought against Belzu and Córdova, continued in his military position. Having resigned the ranks he obtained during the Linares uprising, he was "called back to active service on September 8, 1857, with the rank of effective Colonel." This dispatch, signed by President Linares and Minister of War José María de Acha, was issued in Oruro on February 1, 1859. Villegas remained loyal until Achá betrayed Linares and overthrew him.

=== Governments of Achá, Melgarejo, Morales, and Ballivián ===
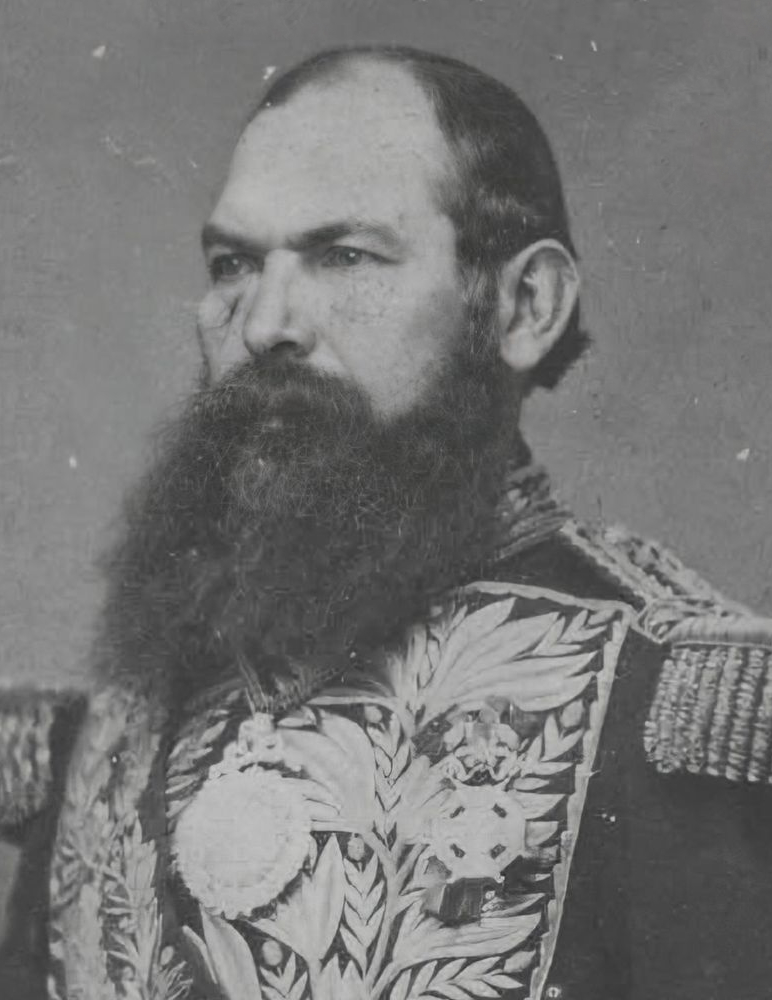
Villegas lived exiled throughout most of Melgarejo's presidency.

Under the Achá administration, Villegas served in the same capacity of colonel in the "Bolívar Squadron," having previously held the position of Commander General of Oruro. Due to his merits and recognized competence, Achá entrusted Villegas with the provisional position of Minister of War, by decree, on September 19, 1862. He participated in the battles of San Juan on September 15, 1862, and the assault on the barricades of La Paz on October 16 of the same year, receiving a wound in the latter engagement that incapacitated him from the early moments. The Extraordinary Legislative Assembly held in Oruro in 1863 promoted Colonel Villegas to the rank of Brigadier general by law on June 25, 1863. Subsequently, he was elected Deputy for the Chayanta District to the 1863 National Assembly, to which he attended in that capacity. He successively held positions as Inspector General of the Army, Commander General of the Department of Cochabamba, Prefect and Commander General of the Department of Oruro, President of the Military Court, and Chief of Staff of the Army.

When Villegas was serving as the Commander General of the Department of Cochabamba, the military insurrection of December 28, 1864, erupted, resulting in the presidency of Mariano Melgarejo. Villegas, along with several others, had to cross Bolivia's borders, being proscribed from the country. The government of Melgarejo, known as the "sexenio," marked a period of dictatorship and caudillism that suppressed various aspects of society. It was a time of revolutions, executions, and assassinations, including that of Belzu.

While in Peru, Villegas received the appointment of Consul in the Peruvian port of Callao, where he distinguished himself in his duties. By the end of 1870, Melgarejo's regime was collapsing. General José María Calderón was besieged La Paz, and Melgarejo fled from Bolivia to Chile. On January 15, 1871, Calderón was finally defeated, and Melgarejo was overthrown. Villegas established his residence in Cochabamba, where he was elected Mayor, and later, by the government of Adolfo Ballivián, Commander General of that Department on May 1, 1873, a position he had already held before. He was holding this position when an uprising occurred; the Third Battalion revolted against its commanders on November 30, 1874. Villegas managed to control the growing force of the rebels. He pursued the mutinous forces and finally succeeded in defeating them on January 7, 1875, in Sipesipe.

=== Frías administration ===
Due to his victory, Villegas was warmly applauded by the government of Tomás Frías, "deserving to be considered one of the most capable men for public office." Villegas was given positions in the President's Secretariat as well as in the Ministry of War. Both of these positions were granted by Eliodoro Camacho, who signed documents on behalf of Villegas. Villegas' victory at Sipesipe was important for the government. However, despite the crushing victory inflicted upon the rebels, the revolution continued to spread across the country. Riots and uprisings grew in number, and much of the Department of Cochabamba was in turmoil, with notable figures leading the insurgents, such as Belisario Antezana, Quintín Quevedo, and Miguel María Aguirre. Nevertheless, Villegas maintained his loyalty to Frías. On 5 February 1875, he was appointed Prefect and Commander General of the Department of Oruro, a position he resigned from on 18 March for health reasons. He was appointed President of the Martial Court on 4 January 1876, and Chief of Staff shortly after.

The Minister of War, Hilarión Daza, who was also the Chief of the First Battalion (Colorados), had through conspiracies risen to high positions and been designated the official candidate for the Presidency of the Republic. He took control of the country on 4 May 1876. He appointed Carlos de Villegas minister of war; who attempted to mitigate the disorder in the administration".

=== Daza administration ===
Villegas was promoted to division general by decree on 21 August 1876, approved by the National Assembly in 1877, and appointed Minister of War by decree on 1 October. Resistance against the coup began in some centers of Bolivia, mainly in Cochabamba, but as they were isolated, they were unsuccessful. The most serious insurrection occurred in Santa Cruz. Villegas was sent to Santa Cruz with instructions to "impose the full rigor of the law on the insurgents".

When Villegas arrived in Santa Cruz, he tried to mitigate the severity of the supreme orders. His decrees, issued to reduce the punishment of the federalists, were strongly criticized by President Daza and gave rise to several letters containing severe reprimands. The federal forces had withdrawn from the city towards the Brazilian border as the 300 men sent by the government approached. Villegas marched through the forests in pursuit, managing to find them in San Diego. Without resistance, they surrendered, offering to go into exile in exchange for their lives, a proposal that was not accepted due to the strict orders of the government. Although Villegas was sympathetic to the rebels, he was ordered to exterminate the leaders of the Santa Cruz revolution. The Council of War sentenced them to death, and the sentence was executed.

The inhabitants of Santa Cruz received Villegas in triumph: the forced loans, amounting to 48,110 pesos (according to El Eventual of Santa Cruz), and the persecutions that had lasted from October 1, 1876, until the arrival of the government army, came to an end. Villegas and the "Pacifying Division of the East" received congratulations from the society of Santa Cruz and the Executive. Upon leaving Santa Cruz, Villegas, after completing the arduous mission entrusted by Daza, addressed the inhabitants of that department in a proclamation summarizing his wishes and justifying his behavior.

== War of the Pacific ==
=== Outbreak of war ===
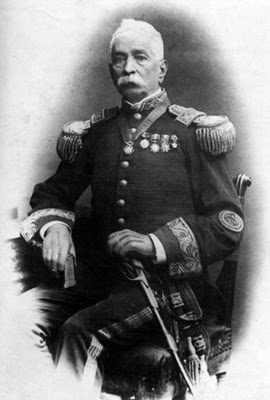
General Buendía, commander of the joint allied army during the Battle of San Francisco.

More significant events were unfolding in the chancelleries of Bolivia, Chile, and Peru. When Villegas returned, crossing the long and difficult road that separated Santa Cruz from La Paz in those times, Bolivia was on the eve of war against Chile. Bolivia was facing a difficult situation due to the scarcity of provisions resulting from the poor harvests of 1878 and the squandering of fiscal revenues. Despite the diligence of the ministers, the administration had been affected by the corruption of Daza and his entourage. The demoralized army absorbed a large part of the budget and, nevertheless, was poorly armed and even worse disciplined. On February 28, 1878, General Villegas was appointed Inspector General of the Army. The news of the occupation of Antofagasta by Chilean forces on February 14, 1879, reached La Paz on the 20th of the same month; by the 23rd, many people already knew about it, although Daza did not act, for unknown reasons, until the 26th when he declared that the country was in danger. Villegas, as the Commander General of the First Division, marched to Tacna. The Bolivian Army, before defending its coastline, hastily marched to defend Peruvian territory, believing that the Chileans had more important plans in Peru. From Tacna, Villegas marched to the coastal area of the Department of Iquique. It is said that while marching, he addressed his soldiers, cursing the corrupt actions of Daza and Mariano Ignacio Prado: "Misappropriation of funds, social disorganization, and political intrigues, disturbed from time to time by more or less noisy protests, reign in our countries. The people do not realize that an abyss is opening at their feet, and journalists and writers use their wit to exalt the favored ones of fortune who have come to occupy public positions".

==== An unforgiving terrain ====
Naval operations had ended in defeat for the allies; on October 8, 1879, the ironclad Huáscar was taken after the death of Commander Miguel Grau. Chile dominated the sea and could choose the landing place for the invading troops. The Chilean squadron sailed from Antofagasta to Pisagua to invade the Tarapacá desert. The defenders of the port of Pisagua, mostly Bolivians, resisted the landing, clashing with the Chilean fleet composed of 19 ships and an army of over ten thousand men on November 2, 1879. The garrison of the port consisted of 800 men, of which 150 were Peruvians. With the loss of Pisagua, the allied army, which had regrouped in Iquique, was in a desperate situation, blocked by the Chilean fleet at sea and trapped in the middle of a desert lacking resources, cut off by the enemy who had taken the town of San Francisco. To improve the situation, a plan was agreed upon to operate the armies of Iquique and Tacna simultaneously against the Chilean army. Daza left Arica on November 10, announcing to General Juan Buendía that he would be in command of the Chilean army on the 16th of that month. The Bolivian army, led by Daza, had to cross the Tarapacá desert. Describing this desert, Vicuña Mackenna says:

The high plateau of Tarapacá, between Iquique and Arica (41 Peruvian leagues), is not uniform like between Iquique and Loa. On the contrary, it is cut in various places by three enormous cracks that bear the name of ravines but are at the same time oases and abysses. The closest to Arica is the Vítor ravine, which is the smallest and flows into the sea nine leagues from that port. There is a small grassy hacienda called Chaca there, and a copper mine owned by Chileans on the banks of the Agua. Following to the south are the two ravines of Chiza and Camarones. Those are two ravines with slopes that look like walls, and the traveler, riding a sturdy and skilled mule, usually takes up to two hours to descend or climb, such is their steep roughness. The renowned amolonas of Illapel, on the road from Coquimbo, are mere scratches on the earth compared to those ravines that still bear all the signs of chaos on their flanks and in their depths. The Camarones ravine is 19 leagues from Arica, and Chiza is 30 leagues away. But both, when reaching the sea, expand into an estuary and form the alfalfa hacienda called Cuya, which, in small pastures owned by various owners, can measure about twenty hectares of irrigated pasture. The richest landowner in the area is, as always, the inevitable Frenchman from Chateaubriand. The towns of Camarones and Chiza are located towards the headwaters of the ravines and are simple settlements of Indians with some groups of straw huts, but are capitals of districts of their name. In the entire journey of the ravine that a stream of pretty color and bad taste moistens, there are patches of alfalfa, and the last one, stopped at Cuya by the sand dunes, as happens in the valleys of Chile when entering the Pacific Ocean, forms a swampy meadow inhabited by swarms of tasty and red shrimp. Hence the generic name of the place.

This harsh terrain acted as one of the greatest obstacles during the War of the Pacific. After arduous marches through this desert of sand and caliche, the Bolivian army arrived at Camarones. However, Daza, "instead of continuing his march towards the enemy, following the itinerary drawn up in advance in combination with the army of Iquique, deviated and cut communications with the Peruvians." While the Bolivian army advanced from the north of Arica until it stopped at Camarones, the allied army under General Buendía had completed its slow and disorderly concentration in Pozo-Almonte. On November 14, the last remaining battalions were ready to march; the plan to unite these two fractions of the allied army was about to be realized. Aside from Buendía, the army was also commanded Bolivian generals Bustamante, Villegas, Villamil, and Flores. The army, however, was unseuccessful; in all movements, the purpose of uniting with the division commanded by Daza was evident, and couriers were dispatched every hour without Daza responding. The soldiers walked most of the night of November 17, and several army units got lost in the shadows. Carlos Molina, a witness, asserts that complete disorder reigned in all desert marches, with guides getting lost: "Over here!", "This way!", the lost ones exclaimed pictorially. They were the lost guides, who, from moment to moment, found and then abandoned the route under the influence of that inexplicable dizziness produced by the thick shadows of the night".

=== Battle of San Francisco ===
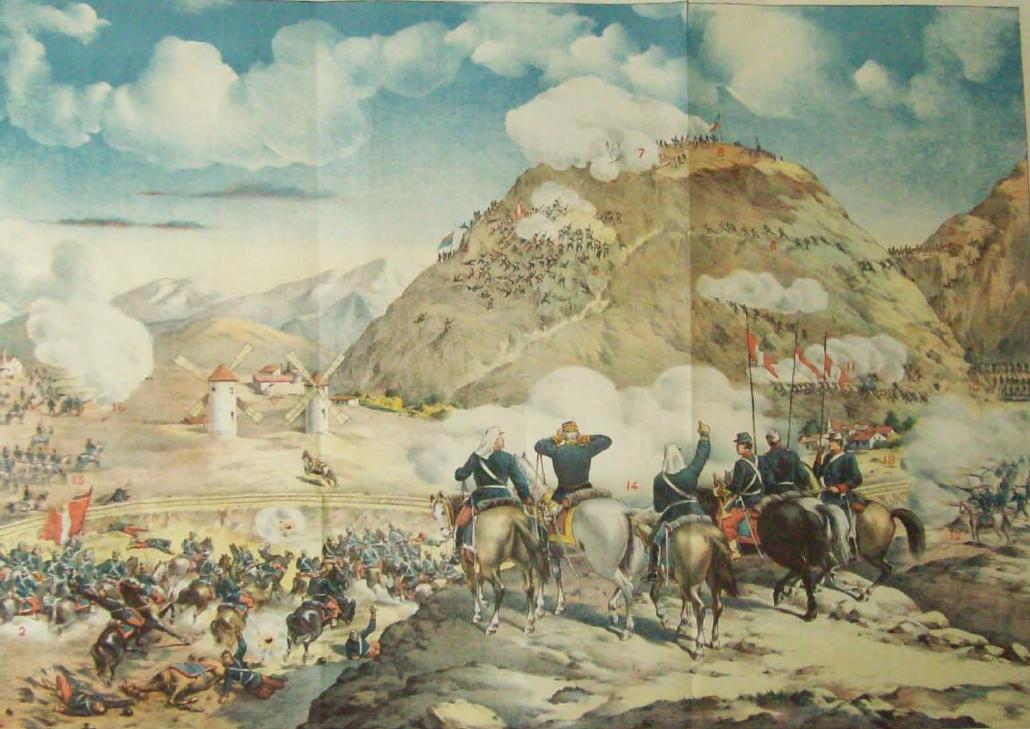
Scene from the Battle of San Francisco, where Villegas was wounded and captured.

Around dawn on November 18, the tired battalions laid down to sleep on the frozen sand or under the makeshift covers of boards and mats from the nitrate works scattered in the Negreiros canton. The exhausted General Buendía took advantage of the scarce gift of sleep while the indefatigable Suárez went around all the posts and kept watch. The Peruvian army spent November 18 in those places with the meager sustenance of their backpacks until three in the afternoon when the delayed convoy of supplies and ammunition arrived in a hundred carts. "At night," eloquently states Molina, "when the wind blows through these solitudes, mysterious moans can be heard coming from the pits. Sometimes underground noises are heard that shake the surface of the petrified coast." That was how disorganized and desperate the situation of the allied army was in the first phase of the war.

By decree of the Supreme Director of the War, dated in Arica, June 6, 1879, General Villegas was incorporated into the army under the command of General Buendía. The Bolivian division commanded by Villegas occupied the coastline between Pisagua and Iquique, and despite the insubordination prevailing in the army, Villegas managed to discipline his soldiers. On the march to the San Francisco hill, the lack of water began to affect the Bolivian army. Villegas constantly complained about this issue, and even though he received promises from Buendía, they were not fulfilled. When the allies reached the Chilean frontline, after a short rest, it was considered best to take a defensive stance, but Buendía's hesitations caused the loss of morning hours and other moments three times until it was decided to postpone the action to the next day: "The Bolivian army was formed: in the center, the 1st and 3rd Divisions, on the far left, the Villamil Division, in the rear forming a second battle line, the Villegas Division, and the reserve was under the command of Andrés Avelino Cáceres".

At nine in the morning, the allied army was ready to attack. The well-positioned Chilean army on the heights of San Francisco faced the allies who, with the order to wait, had formed pavilions with their weapons and blankets to protect themselves from the scorching sun, while the Chilean army received new reinforcements, growing in number and advantages by the moment. The allies were also waiting for the reinforcement commanded by Daza, which, according to the calculations of officers and soldiers, would arrive anytime. Profound silence reigned from that moment, and sixteen thousand men waited for the bugle call to begin the battle. Messengers brought, at that hour, the news of Daza's escape from Camarones. Suddenly, shots were fired in the slope of the hill without explicit order, without an attack plan, and the Chilean batteries began to crush the lines of the allies, whose weapons were useless at such a distance. Disorder enveloped the army, Peruvian cavalry initiated the escape: defeat presented itself from the first moments. Vicuña Mackenna says of the battle: "It is true that the inexperienced Ayacucho (Lima troops) dispersed in a guerrilla near the salt flats and among the pens and mills scattered there to support the attacking columns of Colonel Lavadenz, who led the brave Espinar towards the San Francisco ridge, defended but not dominated by the cannons of the fearless Salvo".

==== Defeat and incarceration ====
Villegas took the lead of his battalion, Illimani, and in a closed column, swept by shrapnel and shot in the back (due to the indescribable confusion in which the rear bodies entered), marched to San Francisco, whose office they occupied, organizing a second attack. In the first ten minutes of the battle, the Bolivians suffered casualties, and several soldiers deserted. Villegas organized a second attack, sent one of his aides to request assistance from Colonel Cáceres, who was in the rear guard, and gave the response that it was not up to him. Villegas began the second attack: "As soon as the vigilant Montoya perceived the parade, he fired his cannons and unleashed a hail of shrapnel on the ascending column, while the Atacama, quickly reorganized, returned to the charge, this time supported by the Coquimbo, which, like the rest of the center and left line, had not ceased firing. The 3rd in line, placed on the plain, contributed greatly to dispersing General Villegas's column, assaulting the Bolivians from behind as they ascended because there was a moment when, mistaking the uniforms, those on the summit stopped shooting because they confused the enemy with a Chilean regiment." The Coquimbo fired 112 shots per square during the day. Wounded in the foot, with his hat and vicuña wool blanket shot to pieces, Villegas was forced to withdraw halfway through the battle. Villegas fought until he was incapacitated by the wound. Transferred to Chile as a prisoner of war, Villegas stayed there until April 1880 when there was an exchange of prisoners between Chile and Bolivia.

== Later life and death ==
On September 20, 1888, he was appointed Commander General in the Department of Cochabamba; on November 26 of the same year, Prefect and Commander General of the Department of La Paz, a position he held from November 27 for a year. He successively received appointments as Government Delegate in the Department of Oruro in May 1889; Inspector General of the National Army in November of the same year; Prefect of La Paz, a position he did not accept; Prefect and Commander General of the Department of Oruro in February 1890. Due to the insurrection led by Colonel José Manuel Pando, he was entrusted with the command of the Government forces. After complying with the orders and the delegation conferred by the Government, he requested his retirement, which was decreed in February 1892. In 1892, he was appointed Jury of the Press in La Paz; in 1893, he was designated to travel to Puno to transfer the remains of General Ballivián. He could not carry out this task, but he was appointed as one of the speakers during the funerals held at the La Paz Cathedral on April 10 of that year.

Villegas died on January 7, 1897, in La Paz. The cause of death is said to have been pneumonia and colerina. After his death, the Bolivian press showered his memory with praise and declared him “the last meritorious general of a lost generation”.

== Bibliography ==
- Arana, Diego Barros (1979). Historia de la guerra del Pacifico, 1879-1881 (in Spanish). Editorial Andres Bello.
- Canales, José Carlos (1947). Mariano Melgarejo: dictator-president of Bolivia, 1864-1871 (in Spanish). University of California.
- Dixon, Jeffrey S.; Sarkees, Meredith Reid (2015-09-18). A Guide to Intra-state Wars: An Examination of Civil, Regional, and Intercommunal Wars, 1816-2014. CQ Press. ISBN 978-1-5063-1798-4.
- Díaz, Julio (1929). Los generales de Bolivia, 1825-1925 (in Spanish). Intendencia general de guerra.
- Guzmán, Luis M. (1872). Historia de la República de Bolivia desde 1824 (in Spanish). Impr. del Siglo.
- Heath, Dwight B. (1972). Historical Dictionary of Bolivia. Scarecrow Press. ISBN 978-0-8108-0451-7.
- Kramer, Pedro (2006). General Carlos de Villegas: estudio histórico biográfico (in Spanish). Taller Tipo-Litográfico.
- Lora, Guillermo (1964). Perspectivas de la revolución boliviana: (La polıt́ica reaccionaria de la Junta Militar conduce a la guerra civil) (in Spanish). Ed. "Masas".
- Moreno, Pascual Ahumada (1884). Guerra del Pacifico: Recopilacion completa de todos los documentos oficiales, correspondencias i demas publicaciones referentes a la guerra que ha dado a luz la prensa de Chile, Perú i Bolivia, conteniendo documentos ineditos de importancia (in Spanish). Imprenta del Progreso.
- Quesadas, Juan Isidro (2006). Paseo genealógico por la Argentina y Bolivia (in Spanish). Centro de Genealogía de Entre Ríos. ISBN 978-987-21302-1-3.
- Ribera, Emilio Durán (1988). La revolución igualitaria de Andrés Ibáñez (in Spanish). Editorial Universitaria.
- Rojas, Carlos Donoso; Pozo, Gonzalo Serrano del (2011). Chile y la Guerra del Pacífico (in Spanish). Ediciones Centro de Estudios Bicentenario. ISBN 978-956-8979-21-8.
- Saucedo, Carlos Hugo Molina (2012). Andrés Ibáñez, un caudillo para el siglo XXI: la Comuna de Santa Cruz de la Sierra de 1876 (in Spanish). CIDES-UMSA. ISBN 978-99954-1-460-3.
- Schelchkov, Andrey (2011). Andrés Ibáñez y la revolución de la igualdad en Santa Cruz: primer ensayo de federalismo en Bolivia, 1876-1877 (in Spanish). Universidad de Santiago de Chile. ISBN 978-956-8416-28-7.
- Velarde, J. Fellmann (1981). Historia de Bolivia ... Vol. 2.
