= Juan de los Ríos y Berriz =

Most Reverend Pedro Cárdenas y Arbieto
- Bishop of Santa Cruz de la Sierra
- Church: Catholic Church
- Diocese: Diocese of Santa Cruz de la Sierra
- In office: 1687–1698
- Predecessor: Pedro Cárdenas y Arbieto
- Successor: Juan Francisco de Padilla y San Martín

Orders
- Consecration: December 21, 1681 by Melchor Liñán y Cisneros

Personal details
- Born: 1631 Lima, Peru
- Died: 1698 (age 67) Santa Cruz de la Sierra, Bolivia

Juan de los Ríos y Berriz (1631–1698) was a Roman Catholic prelate who served as Bishop of Santa Cruz de la Sierra (1687–1698).

== Biography ==
Juan de los Ríos y Berriz was born in Lima, Peru. On April 28, 1687, he was selected by the King of Spain and confirmed by Pope Innocent XI as Bishop of Santa Cruz de la Sierra. In 1688, he was consecrated bishop by Melchor Liñán y Cisneros, Archbishop of Lima. He served as Bishop of Santa Cruz de la Sierra until his death in 1698.

== External links and additional sources ==
- Cheney, David M. "Archdiocese of Santa Cruz de la Sierra". Catholic-Hierarchy.org. (for Chronology of Bishops) ^{[self-published]}
- Chow, Gabriel. "Metropolitan Archdiocese of Santa Cruz de la Sierra". GCatholic.org. (for Chronology of Bishops) ^{[self-published]}

Religious titles
Preceded by Pedro Cárdenas y Arbieto	Bishop of Santa Cruz de la Sierra; 1687–1698	Succeeded by Juan Francisco de Padilla y San Martín
