= Torotoro, Bolivia =

Toro Toro
- Town
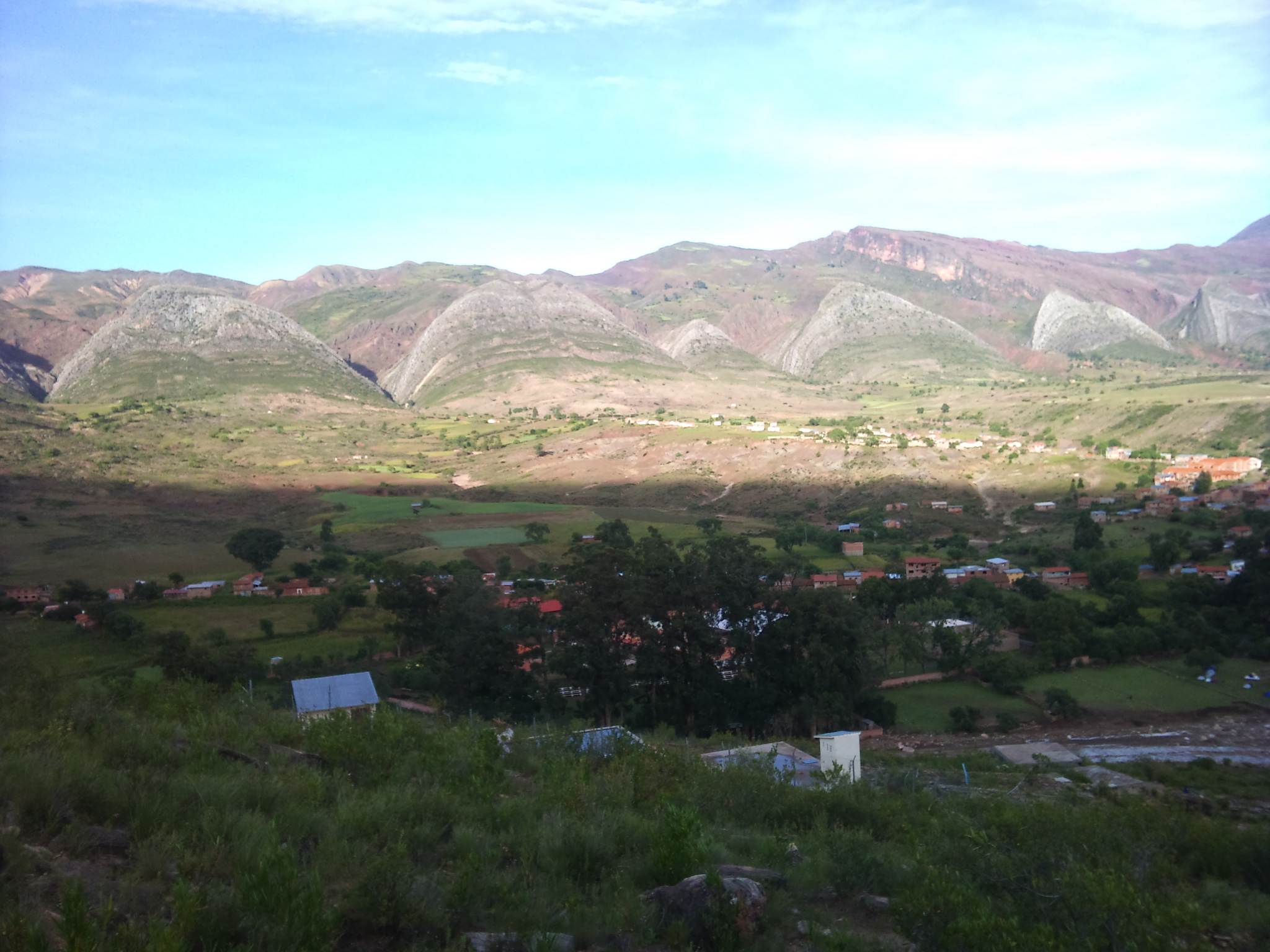
- the town Toro Toro

- Location within Bolivia
- Coordinates: 18°8′S 65°46′W
- Country: Bolivia
- Department: Potosí Department
- Province: Charcas Province
- Municipality: Toro Toro Municipality

Population (2024)
  - Total: 10,719
- Time zone: UTC-4 (BOT)

Torotoro (or Toro Toro) is a town in the Charcas Province, Potosí Department, Bolivia.

Torotoro was founded in the late colonial period by mestizo migrants from Cochabamba and legally confirmed as a municipality (municipio) on 21 November 1883. The municipality has an area of 1,169 km² and a population of 10,719 according to the 2024 census.

Torotoro lies at an altitude of 2,676 m. It can only be reached by road from Estancia Sucusuma at the Río Caine. The town is at the centre of Torotoro National Park. It is 140 km south of Cochabamba.
