= Pedro Cárdenas y Arbieto =

Peruvian Roman Catholic prelate

Most Reverend Pedro Cárdenas y Arbieto
- Bishop of Santa Cruz de la Sierra
- Church: Catholic Church
- Diocese: Diocese of Santa Cruz de la Sierra
- In office: 1680–1687
- Predecessor: Juan de Esturizada
- Successor: Juan de los Ríos y Berriz

Orders
- Consecration: December 21, 1681 by Melchor Liñán y Cisneros

Personal details
- Born: 1640 Lima, Peru
- Died: 1687 (age 47) Santa Cruz de la Sierra, Bolivia

Pedro Cárdenas y Arbieto (1640–1687) was a Roman Catholic prelate who served as Bishop of Santa Cruz de la Sierra (1680–1687).

== Biography ==
Pedro Cárdenas y Arbieto was born in Lima, Peru. On May 13, 1680, he was selected by the King of Spain and confirmed by Pope Innocent XI as Bishop of Santa Cruz de la Sierra. On December 21, 1681, he was consecrated bishop by Melchor Liñán y Cisneros, Archbishop of Lima. He served as Bishop of Santa Cruz de la Sierra until his death in 1687.

== External links and additional sources ==
- Cheney, David M. "Archdiocese of Santa Cruz de la Sierra". Catholic-Hierarchy.org. (for Chronology of Bishops) ^{[self-published]}
- Chow, Gabriel. "Metropolitan Archdiocese of Santa Cruz de la Sierra". GCatholic.org. (for Chronology of Bishops) ^{[self-published]}

Religious titles
Preceded by Juan de Esturizada	Bishop of Santa Cruz de la Sierra; 1680–1687	Succeeded by Juan de los Ríos y Berriz
