= Archdiocese of Santa Cruz de la Sierra =

Catholic ecclesiastical territory

Coordinates: 17.7841°S 63.1818°W

Archdiocese of Santa Cruz de la Sierra Archidioecesis Sanctae Crucis de Sierra Arquidiócesis de Santa Cruz de la Sierra

Catholic
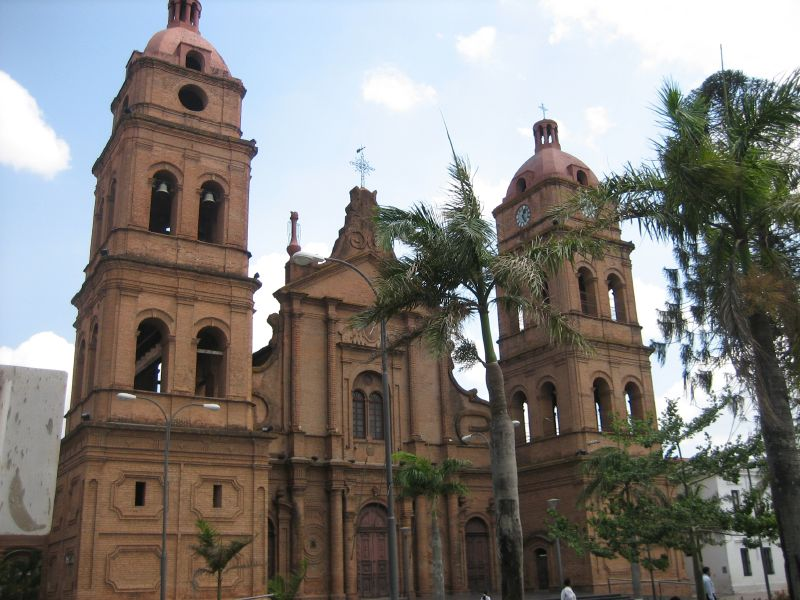
- Metropolitan Cathedral-Basilica of St. Lawrence

Location
- Country: Bolivia
- Ecclesiastical province: Santa Cruz de la Sierra

Statistics
- Area: 50,000 km^{2} (19,000 sq mi)
- Population: Total; Catholics: (as of 2010); 2,291,000; 1,805,000 (78.8%)
- Parishes: 72

Information
- Denomination: Catholic Church
- Rite: Roman Rite
- Established: 5 July 1605 (421 years ago)
- Cathedral: Cathedral Basilica of St Lawrence in Santa Cruz de la Sierra

Current leadership
- Pope: Leo XIV
- Metropolitan Archbishop: René Leigue Cesari
- Auxiliary Bishops: Stanisław Dowlaszewicz Billman
- Bishops emeritus: Sergio Alfredo Gualberti Calandrina; Braulio Sáez Garcia

Map

Website
- Website of the Archdiocese

The Roman Catholic Archdiocese of Santa Cruz de la Sierra (Latin: Archidioecesis Sanctae Crucis de Sierra) is an ecclesiastical territory or diocese of the Roman Catholic Church in Bolivia. It was erected as the Diocese of Santa Cruz de la Sierra by Pope Paul V on July 5, 1605, and was elevated to the rank of a metropolitan archdiocese by Pope Paul VI on July 30, 1975, with the suffragan see of San Ignacio de Velasco.

The seat of its archbishop is Cathedral-Basilica of San Lorenzo. The current archbishop of Santa Cruz de la Sierra is René Leigue Cesari.

== Ordinaries ==
=== Diocese of Santa Cruz de la Sierra ===
founded July 5, 1605

- Antonio Calderón de León (1605–1621 Died)
- Fernando de Ocampo, OFM (1621–1632 Died)
- Juan de Zapata y Figueroa (1635–1642 Died)
- Juan de Arguinao y Gutiérrez, OP (1646–1659, appointed Archbishop of Santafé en Nueva Granada)
- Juan de Ribera, OSA (1659–1666 Died)
- Bernardino de Cárdenas Ponce, OFM (1666–1668 Died)
- Juan de Esturizada, OP (1672–1679 Died))
- Pedro Cárdenas y Arbieto (1680–1687 Died)
- Juan de los Ríos y Berriz (1687–1698 Died)
- Juan Francisco de Padilla y San Martín, OdeM (1699–1700 Died)
- Pedro Vásquez de Velasco (1706–1714 Died)
- Jaime de Mimbela, OP (1714–1720 appointed, Bishop of Trujillo)
- Juan Cavero de Toledo (1720–1725 Appointed, Bishop of Arequipa)
- Joannes de Moncada Hurtado de Figueroa (1725–1725 Died)
- Miguel Bernardino de la Fuenta y Rojas (1728–1741, appointed Bishop of Ayacucho o Huamanga)
- Andrés Vergara Uribe (1741–1744 Died)
- Juan Pablo de Olmedo (1745–1755 Died)
- Bernardo José Pérez de Oblitas (1756–1760 Died)
- Francisco Ramón Herboso y Figueroa, OP (1761–1776, appointed Archbishop of La Plata o Charcas)
- Juan Domingo González de la Reguera (1776–1780, appointed Archbishop of Lima)
- Alejandro José de Ochoa y Morillo (1782–1791, appointed Bishop of La Paz)
- José Ramón de Estrada y Orgas (1791–1792 Died)
- Manuel Nicolás Rojas de Argandoña (1795–1803 Died)
- Antonio de San Firmino, OCarm (1805–1806 Died)
- Francisco Javier Aldazábal y Lodeña (1807–1812 Died)
- Agustín Francisco de Otondo Escurruchea, CO (1816–1826 Died)
- José Manuel Fernández de Córdoba y Meló (1835–1840 Appointed Bishop of La Paz)
- Francisco de Paula León de Aguirre Velasco (1840 Appointed - Did Not Take Effect)
- Manuel Ángel del Prado Cárdenas (1846–1855 Appointed Archbishop of La Plata o Charcas)
- Agustín Gómez Cabezas y Sildo (1856–1862 Died)
- Francisco Javier Rodríguez (1869–1877 Died)
- Juan José Baldivia Morales (1878–1891 Appointed Bishop of La Paz)
- José Belisario Santistevan Seoane (1891–1931 Died)
- Daniel Rivero Rivero (1931–1940 Appointed Archbishop of Sucre)
- Augustin Arce Mostajo (1940–1958 Resigned)
- Luis Aníbal Rodríguez Pardo (1958–1975)

=== Archdiocese of Santa Cruz de la Sierra ===
elevated July 30, 1975

- Luis Aníbal Rodríguez Pardo (1975–1991 Retired)
- Julio Cardenal Terrazas Sandoval, CSsR (1991–2013 Retired)
- Sergio Alfredo Gualberti Calandrina (2013–2022 Retired)
- René Leigue Cesari (2022–present)

== Other affiliated bishops ==
=== Coadjutor bishops ===
- Fernando de Ocampo, OFM 1620–1621)
- José Belisario Santistevan Seoane (1890–1891)
- Daniel Rivero Rivero (1922–1931)
- Sergio Alfredo Gualberti Calandrina (2011–2013)

=== Auxiliary Bishops ===
- Rafael de La Vara (1800–1806), appointed Archbishop of Guatemala
- Luis Aníbal Rodríguez Pardo (1952–1953), appointed Bishop of Oruro (later returned here as Archbishop)
- José Armando Gutiérrez Granier (1954–1956), appointed Auxiliary Bishop of La Paz
- Carlos Arturo Brown, MM (1957–1997)
- Tito Solari Capellari, SDB (1986–1998), appointed Coadjutor Archbishop of Cochabamba
- Nino Marzoli, CR (1992–2000)
- Sergio Alfredo Gualberti Calandrina (1999-2011), appointed Coadjutor here
- Stanisław Dowlaszewicz Billman, OFMConv (2001–present)
- Braulio Sáez Garcia, OCD (2003–2018)
- René Leigue Cesari (2013–2022), appointed Archbishop here

== See also ==
- Roman Catholicism in Bolivia
- List of Roman Catholic dioceses in Bolivia
