= Diocese of San Ignacio de Velasco =

Catholic ecclesiastical territory

Diocese of San Ignacio de Velasco Dioecesis Sancti Ignatii Velascani Diócesis de San Ignacio de Velasco

Catholic

Location
- Country: Bolivia
- Ecclesiastical province: Santa Cruz de la Sierra
- Metropolitan: Santa Cruz de la Sierra

Statistics
- Area: 197,000 km^{2} (76,000 sq mi)
- Population: Total; Catholics: (as of 2010); 245,000; 220,000 (89.8%)
- Parishes: 22

Information
- Denomination: Roman Catholic
- Rite: Roman Rite
- Established: 27 January 1930 (96 years ago)
- Cathedral: Cathedral of St Ignatius in San Ignacio de Velasco

Current leadership
- Pope: Leo XIV
- Bishop: Robert Herman Flock
- Metropolitan Archbishop: Sergio Alfredo Gualberti

Map

The Roman Catholic Diocese of San Ignacio de Velasco (Latin: Dioecesis Sancti Ignatii Velascani) is a diocese located in the city of San Ignacio de Velasco in the ecclesiastical province of Santa Cruz de la Sierra in Bolivia.

== History ==
- January 27, 1930: Established as Apostolic Vicariate of Chiquitos from the Diocese of Santa Cruz de la Sierra
- November 3, 1994: Promoted as Diocese of San Ignacio de Velasco

== Bishops ==
Using reverse chronological order:

- Bishops of San Ignacio de Velasco (Roman rite)
  - Bishop Robert Herman Flock (2017.02.02 – present)
  - Bishop Carlos Stetter (1995.07.29 – 2016.11.04)
  - Bishop Federico Bonifacio Madersbacher Gasteiger, O.F.M. (1994.11.03 – 1995.07.29)
- Vicars Apostolic of Chiquitos (Roman rite)
  - Bishop Federico Bonifacio Madersbacher Gasteiger, O.F.M. (1974.08.21 – 1994.11.03)
  - Bishop José Calasanz Rosenhammer, O.F.M. (1949.05.12 – 1974.08.21)
  - Bishop Juan Tarsicio Senner, O.F.M. (1942.02.25 – 1949)
  - Bishop Bertoldo Bühl, O.F.M. (1931.01.08 – 1941)

=== Coadjutor bishops ===
- Carlos Stetter (1995)
- Federico Bonifacio Madersbacher Gasteiger, O.F.M. (1970-1974), as Coadjutor Vicar Apostolic

=== Auxiliary bishop ===
- Carlos Stetter (1987-1995), appointed Coadjutor here

== See also ==
- Roman Catholicism in Bolivia
