= Hernán Terrazas =

Bolivian general and politician (1926–2020)

Hernán Terrazas Céspedes
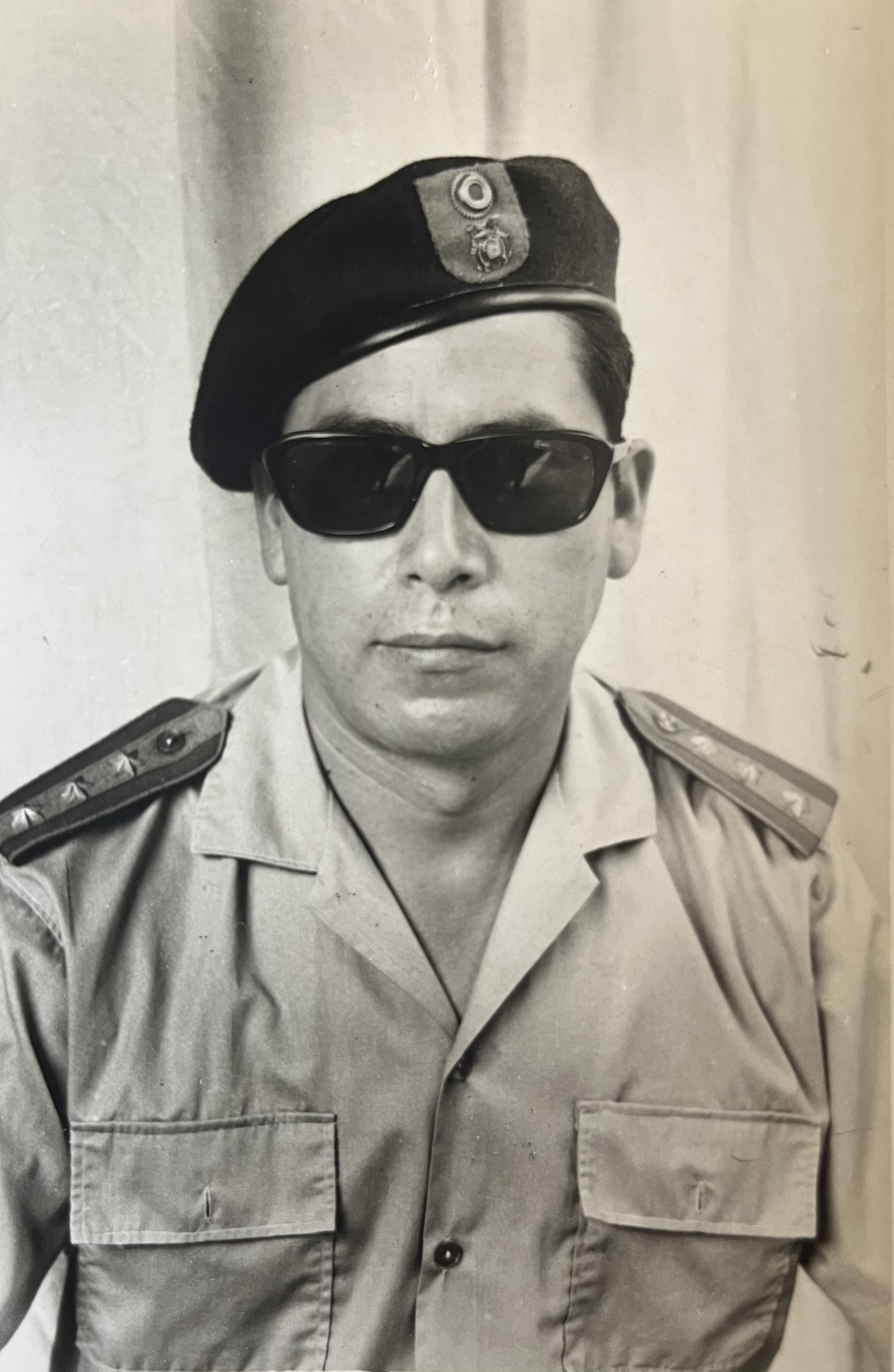
- General Hernán Terrazas Céspedes in 1970.

Mayor of Cochabamba
- In office 1 December 1978 – 31 July 1979
- Preceded by: José Luis Márquez
- Succeeded by: Ernesto Daza Rivero (acting)

Personal details
- Born: December 3, 1926 Cochabamba, Bolivia
- Died: November 6, 2020 (aged 93) La Paz, Bolivia
- Party: Revolutionary Nationalist Movement (1952–2020)
- Spouse: Angélica Beatriz de Alencar Calderón de la Barca
- Children: 2
- Parent(s): Eugenio Terrazas Tapia; Octavia Céspedes Ugarte
- Education: Military College of the Army
- Awards: Order of the Condor of the Andes; Order of Military Merit (Grand Officer)

Military service
- Allegiance: Bolivia
- Branch/service: Bolivian Army
- Years of service: 1948–1979
- Rank: Division general
- Commands: 4th Division

Hernán Terrazas Céspedes (3 December 1926 – 6 November 2020) was a Bolivian general, politician, and diplomat who served as Mayor of Cochabamba during the era of dictatorships in Bolivia. Early in his military career he was stationed in the Rocha Regiment and, as a second lieutenant, formed part of the rebel lines in Incahuasi during the 1949 coup d'état in Bolivia.

Serving as Bolivia’s Military Attaché in West Germany in the early 1960s, Terrazas was an intelligence officer at the height of the Cold War. Trained with the rigorous curriculum of the School of the Americas (SOTA), his area of expertise was nuclear warfare. Graduating from this institution, he also presided over several classes and instructed other Latin American military officers in counterinsurgency. The government of the United States trained officers like Terrazas to suppress and combat against potential communist fifth columns that might form across South America with the backing of the Soviet Union.

Returning to Bolivia after the rise of René Barrientos, Terrazas continued his military career and held positions across several intelligence agencies, most of which were backed by the Central Intelligence Agency. As such, Terrazas had a more bureaucratic role in the capture of Che Guevara. Gary Prado Salmón employed tactics from the SOTA and received directives from Terrazas’ office, since he was his superior, when chasing and eventually capturing Guevara. Although Terrazas did not have an active role in Guevara’s capture and eventual death, as a commando he was deployed by orders of President Barrientos in the vicinity of La Higuera to ensure the guerilla was cut off from outside aid. By 1971, Hugo Banzer had seized power and Terrazas was eventually promoted to the rank of brigadier general by this newly instated regime. During the so-called banzerato, Terrazas carried out several diplomatic missions in Argentina, Brazil, and Peru. Promoted to division general, he was given command of the 4th division of the Bolivian Army, stationed in Camiri. In 1977, he was appointed Chief of Staff of the Army. After the fall of Banzer, Terrazas served as Mayor of Cochabamba briefly before retiring into private life.

== Early life and military career ==
=== Birth and family ===
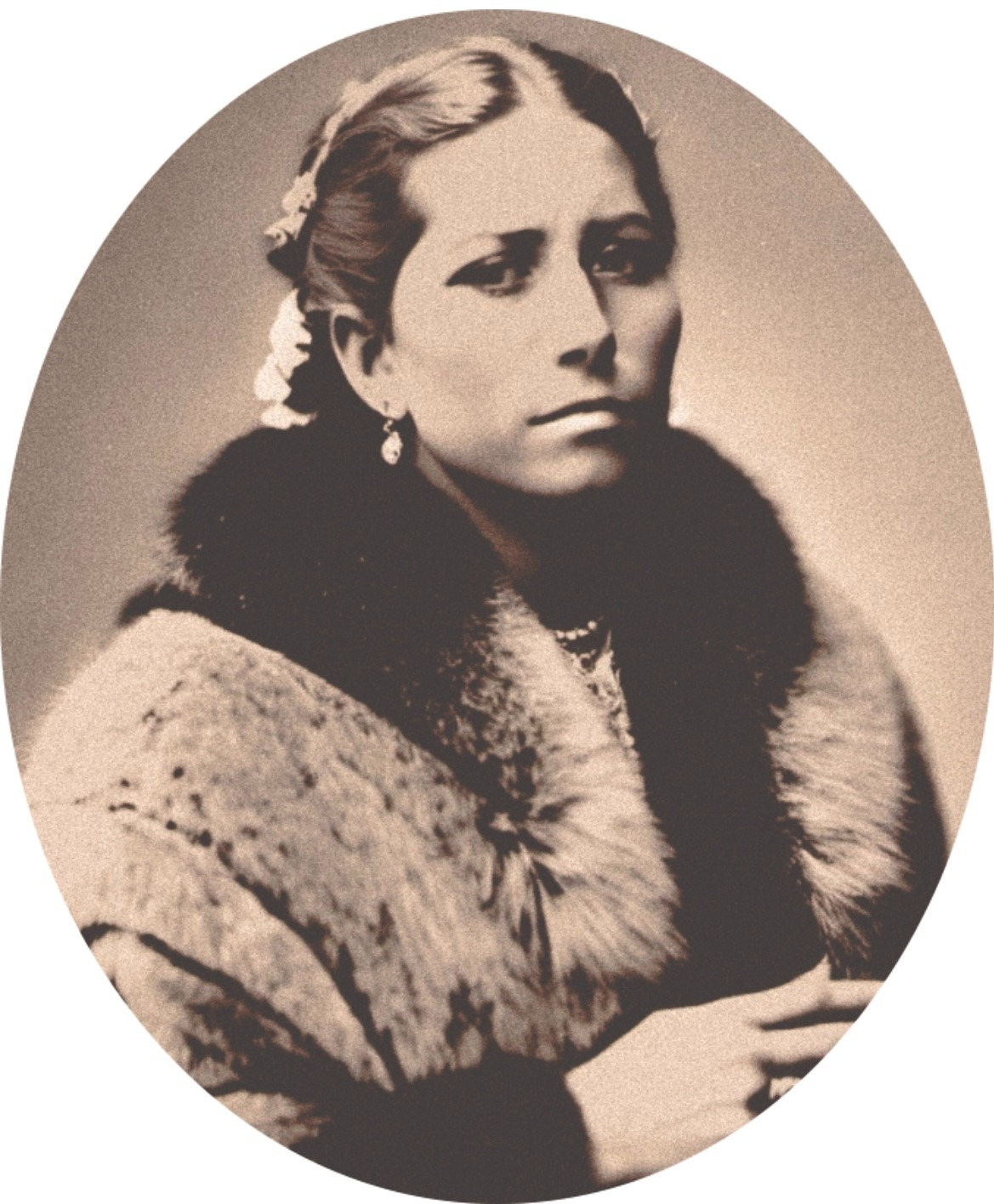
Octavia Céspedes, mother of General Terrazas.

Born in the city of Cochbamba, Cochabamba Department, on December 3, 1926, he was the son of Eugenio Terrazas Tapia and Octavia Céspedes Ugarte. The Terrazas family was a prominent and wealthy landowning family based in the Cochabamba and Santa Cruz Departments of Bolivia. The family had properties in Mizque, Tarata, Anzaldo, and Pojo. Their lands expanded as well into the Chuquisaca and Potosí Departments, having vast properties in Padilla and Torotoro. His family lived in Torotoro, where he was raised. At a young age, he moved to La Paz with his older brother Manuel, a veteran of the Chaco War. He joined the Military College of the Army, the so-called "Colegio Militar del Ejército, Cnl. Gualberto Villarroel López," in 1941. His military career began there, where he was a classmate of future president Hugo Banzer. Terrazas graduated in 1947 with the rank of second lieutenant.

=== Graduation and the Civil War of 1949 ===
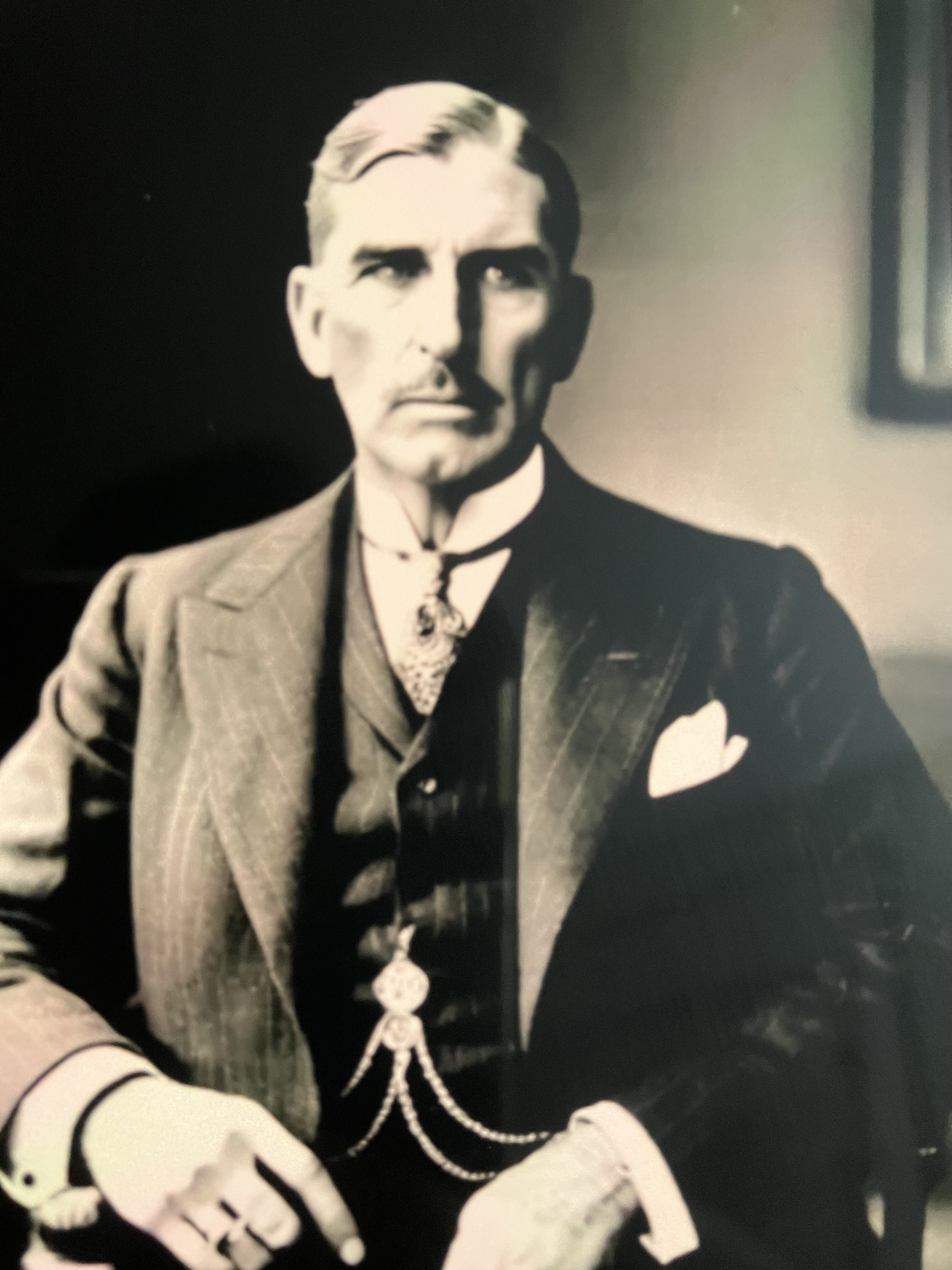
Eugenio Terrazas, father of General Terrazas.

Not long after his military career had just begun, Bolivia found itself in a moment of chaos. After the brutal lynching of President Gualberto Villarroel in 1946, the oligarchs of the nation attempted to sideline the Revolutionary Nationalist Movement (MNR) and undo the reforms carried out by the socialist military regimes since the presidency of Germán Busch.

The repression that followed would climax in the so-called civil war of 1949. Among the rebel, Terrazas backed the MNR and partook in the uprising at Incahuasi. The rebellion was ultimately crushed and, along with many others, Terrazas was incarcerated. Though the rebellion had come to an end, the oligarchy's rule over the country remained unstable.

By 1951, the MNR was again troubling the government. President Mamerto Urriolagoitía, in an attempt to deal with the civil unrest and military intrigues, installed General Hugo Ballivián as his successor in a self-coup known as the Mamertazo. Terrazas, who was a staunch supporter of the MNR, joined the plot against the new government which, by early 1952, was gaining momentum. The government and their struggle for legitimacy culminated in the Bolivian National Revolution of 1952. The echoes of the coup d’état of 1949 resonated within the events of 1952. Terrazas, a party member, supported the overthrow of the regime. Finally, the old oligarchic republic overthrown and the MNR in power. The events of 1952 would propel Terrazas’ career to new heights and would lead him to high positions in the future.

=== Rise of the MNR ===
A loyal MNR member even before the coup d’état in 1949, Terrazas supported the policies of the party’s leadership. Víctor Paz Estenssoro and Hernán Siles Zuazo, the leading figures of the MNR, agreed to join the Alliance for Progress, which was the result of increasing American influence in Latin America. As a result, the Bolivian military entered into the sphere of influence of the SOTA. Terrazas, like many other Latin American military officers, was a graduate and instructor of this institution. In 1961, while he held the rank of Major, he became the instructor of the SOTA’s program on nuclear warfare. Terrazas was an expert on this subject in Bolivia and travelled to the Panama Canal Zone, the original location of the SOA before its expulsion in 1984, to give lessons and participate in seminars.

In the late 1950s and early 1960s, Terrazas served as President Paz Estenssoro's aide-de-camp. As such, he was present in several important ceremonies, diplomatic receptions, and foreign delegations. For instance, he was present when Prince Philip, Duke of Edinburgh visited Bolivia. Furthermore, he was with Paz Estenssoro during a state visit to Venezuela, at the time under the presidency of Rómulo Betancourt. A trusted member of the presidential retinue, Terrazas was eventually sent to West Germany as a military attaché in 1962. This constituted his entry into the world of politics and diplomacy.

When Paz Estenssoro was overthrown in 1964, Terrazas returned to Bolivia and was promoted to the rank of colonel. After being promoted to this rank, Terrazas served as a representative of the Bolivian Armed Forces to the Development Corporation of the Oruro Department. Under his supervision, large parts of the city Oruro were developed and expanded, contributing greatly to improving the infrastructure of a city long overlooked by previous representatives. In 1970, Juan José Torres appointed Terrazas as Director of the Military Historical Association.

== Later military career ==
=== Banzerato and generalship ===
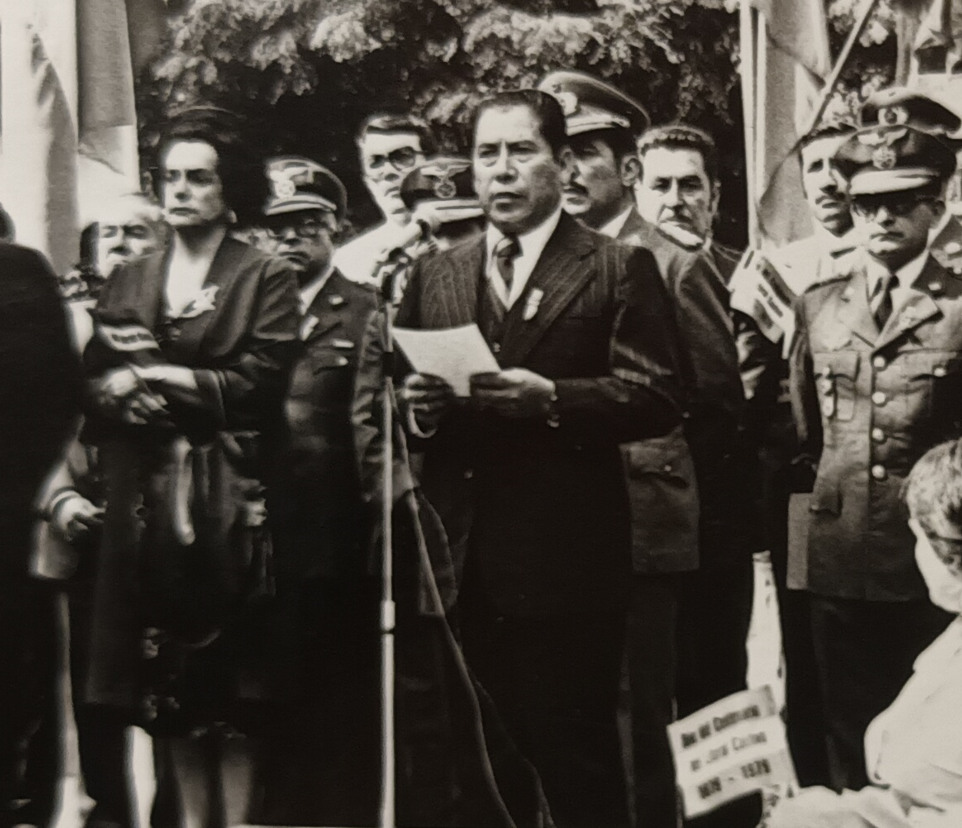
Terrazas giving a speech during the centenary of the War of the Pacific.

In 1971, Hugo Banzer and a group of other colonels launched a coup that overthrew Torres. Classmates at the Military College of the Army, Terrazas and Banzer had known each other for a long time. Between 1972 and 1974, Terrazas was a candidate for promotion but was passed over twice. Nonetheless, his endeavors were successful as he reached the rank of general by 1974. First, he was promoted to brigadier general in 1974. Later on, he was promoted to division general by a Supreme Decree passed by Banzer himself. As senior officer of the Bolivian Army, Terrazas carried out several diplomatic missions and held a variety of positions within the army. Among the positions he held, Terrazas served as Chief of Staff of the Bolivian Armed Forces and as Inspector General of the army.

He also represented Bolivia in state visits to Brazil, Argentina, and Chile. Visits to these particular countries were most likely carried out to ensure the continued co-operation between the participants of Operation Condor. Jorge Rafael Videla, Augusto Pinochet, and Ernesto Geisel were all important allies of their fellow dictator Banzer. Altogether, this was an effort to contain the spread of communism or anti-americanism in the Southern Cone. Trained in counterinsurgency and guerilla warfare, Terrazas' commando training was a byproduct of the Monroe Doctrine. For his central roles in several visits to Brazil, Geisel granted the illustrious Brazilian Order of Military Merit to Terrazas on 8 March 1978.

=== Mayor of Cochabamba ===
Not long after Banzer had been ousted by Juan Pereda, Terrazas was appointed Mayor of Cochabamba. Terrazas advocated for the development of the town of Torotoro and its infrastructure whilst he was Mayor. Participating in such an activity was common at the time and a part of the urban-rural dynamics coming from the major metropolitan center of Cochabamba. Terrazas also drafted several plans, in his short tenure, to improve the urban infrastructure of the city. Although almost no construction began during his tenure, most of Terrazas' urban planning, which took into consideration the necessity of functionality and profit, was carried out by his successors. The unstable political situation of the country at the time eventually forced Terrazas out of office. Not long after this, he had been forcibly retired alongside the majority of generals that worked closely with Banzer.

== Personal life ==
Terrazas was married to Angélica Beatriz de Alencar Calderón de la Barca, a member of the Alencar family through her grandfather the Baron of Alencar. She was also a descendant of Bárbara de Alencar, the Baron of Alencar's paternal grandmother and a key figure in the independence of Brazil from Portugal. The marriage produced two children, Adolfo (1957) and Patricia (1962). His daughter, Patricia, is married to Rodrigo De Urioste, grandson of the Bolivian industrialist Armando Julio de Urioste Arana.

== Later life and death ==
Later in his life, Terrazas helped author J.J. Benítez in his work El Hombre que susurraba a los «Ummitas» (2007), a novel seeking to answer whether alien life existed.

Terrazas died of a stroke at his home in La Paz on 6 November 2020, aged 93.
