= Manuel Terrazas =

- Born: Tarata, Bolivia
- Died: Bolivia
- Occupation: Military officer
- Years active: 1861–1883

Lieutenant Colonel Manuel Terrazas was a Bolivian military officer who served during the War of the Pacific. He was the cousin of Mariano Ricardo Terrazas, a famous Bolivian writer and educator.

== Early life ==
He did not grow up in the family's hacienda in Quillacollo. Instead, he was raised in Tarata. He would attend the classes of one Father Ignacio Tapia at the local church in Tarata, where he became an acquaintance of Severo Melgarejo Rojas, the son of Mariano Melgarejo.

Unlike his cousins, who belonged to a wealthier side of the family, Terrazas did not enjoy the privilege of being sent to Paris. Instead, he remained in his family's hacienda in Tarata. His name is registered at an inn in San Juan, Argentina, suggesting he might have traveled for business across the Argentine interior and perhaps even Peru.

== Rise and fall of Melgarejo ==
In 1861, José María de Achá, with the help of Mariano Melgarejo, ousted the government of President José María Linares. The bloody revolution led to Melgarejo's promotion to the rank of general. Now wealthy and powerful, Melgarejo invited his son to join the Military College of La Paz and become a military officer. Terrazas joined Severo Melgarejo and traveled to La Paz with him, enlisting there in July 1862. By 1864, the country found itself engulfed in the flames of civil war, leading to Achá's overthrow. In the barracks of the city of Tupiza, Terrazas supported the regime of Melgarejo. Because of his relationship with Melgarejo's son and his support, he was promoted to the rank of first lieutenant.

Now a lieutenant, he was given a favourable posting in Tarata, his hometown. He was promised a promotion by Melgarejo, but this plan was disrupted by the Constitutionalist Rebellion of 1866. Led by Casto Arguedas, Nicanor Flores, and Ildefonso Sanjines, the rebellion nearly ousted Melgarejo. In Tarata, Terrazas defeated a small contingent of forces led by Colonel Ernesto Benavides. Despite his continued loyalty for Melgarejo, the caudillo deemed Terrazas a traitor and ordered his execution. In a twist of irony, Terrazas fled the country with the man he had defeated earlier, Colonel Benavides.

Terrazas spent a few years in exile until 1870, when he joined a movement spearheaded by Tomás Frías to overthrow the tyrannical rule of Melgarejo. He headed to Tarata, where he enlisted a few hundred men to assault the barracks at Cochabamba. Successful, the rebels took the city and marched toward La Paz. By January 1871, Melgarejo was forced to flee the country.

== The purge ==
Deemed a traitor by the newly appointed President Agustín Morales, Terrazas was once again forced to leave the country. He stayed with his friend, Severo Melgarejo, in Santiago for some months before returning to Bolivia. Morales’ purge had ended by early 1872. However, because he was still a suspect, most of his assets were seized and he was erased from the military list of Bolivia. Having lost everything, he was given a plot of land by his cousin, Mariano.

== War of the Pacific ==
General Hilarión Daza declared war on Chile on February 14, 1879. Mass mobilization followed across the country and Terrazas joined the army. He was restored to the military list and was promoted to major. He was assigned to General Narciso Campero, who commanded the division Camarones. For unknown reasons, he defected from Campero's army on the night of December 9. In disobedience to General Arguedas’ orders, Terrazas joined General Flores’ division. Given a battalion with 200 cavalrymen, Terrazas was sent on a scouting mission in preparation for the Battle of Tacna. While on the mission, his battalion was massacred by a Chilean ambush near Miculla.

Surviving the incident at Miculla, he was promoted to lieutenant colonel for bravery. Although the Bolivian army would not see any more combat after 1881, Terrazas remained active in Peru, carrying out campaigns in the Sierra. Under attack from the troops of Patricio Lynch, who was tasked with eliminating the guerrillas in the Mantaro Valley, Terrazas fought at the Battle of La Concepción on July 10, 1882.

Within a month, Chilean troops had crushed most of the guerrilla activity in Mantaro and Terrazas disbanded his battalion headed for Huamachuco. There, he joined the army of General Andrés Avelino Cáceres. Several months later, Chilean General Alejandro Gorostiaga planned to capture the city. On July 10, 1883, Terrazas saw action again during the Battle of Huamachuco.
