= Garzon (suffragan) =

Suffragan of Archdiocese of Popayán in Colombia

Garzon is a suffragan of the Archdiocese of Popayán in the Republic of Colombia. Lying east of Popayán, the diocese comprises the provinces of Neiva and Sur. It is about 140 miles in length and between 40 and 100 miles wide. The episcopal see (unlike most, not eponymous) is at Neiva. The 11,000 inhabitants of Garzon are mainly of mixed origin and almost entirely Catholic. The town is situated 150 miles southwest of Bogotá at a height of 1,500 feet above sea level. It is on the Magdalena River, which is navigable to this point.

The cathedral of Garzon is dedicated to the Immaculate Conception of Our Lady.

== History ==
The diocese was originally formed as part of the Diocese of Tolima, which lay in the midst of the Cordilleras. As the territory was so extensive, the population very numerous and the difficulties of visitation too great, the Bishop petitioned the Holy See to divide the diocese. This was done by a decree of Leo XIII on June 20, 1900. The northern half was erected into a new Diocese of Ibagué, suffragan of Bogotá, while the southern half formed the new Diocese of Garzon.

Born on January 15, 1859, in El Hato in the Diocese of Popayán, Estéban Rojas became the first bishop of Garzon. He had previously served as bishop in the Diocese of Tolima (since 1895).
