= Thibiuca =

Africa Proconsularis (125 AD)

Tibiuca was a Roman era civitas of the Roman province of Africa Proconsularis.

Tibiuca has been tentatively identified with ruins at Henchir-Gâssa, Tunisia.

During antiquity, Tibiuca was the seat of an ancient bishopric, suffragan of the Archdiocese of Carthage. There are two bishops attributable to Roman era Tibiuca. The first is Felix of Thibiuca, who suffered at the time of Diocletian; his vita reports that he was deported to Italy and martyred in Venosa in Apulia. It is commemorated in the Roman martyrology on the date of October 24. Another bishop of Tibiuca was Pascasio, who took part in the Council of Carthage (411). The diocese at that time had no Donatist bishops. Today, Tibiuca survives as titular bishopric and the current bishop is Eugenio Coter, Apostolic Vicar of Pando.
