= Banzer Plan =

Leaked plan to suppress left-wing Roman Catholic dissent

The Banzer Plan is the name given to a leaked plan to discredit liberation theology and suppress left-wing Roman Catholic dissent. Endorsed by ten Latin American governments in the 1970s, the so-called Banzer Plan was originally formulated in Bolivia in 1975. It was developed in collaboration with the United States Central Intelligence Agency. The name comes from President Hugo Banzer, then-ruler of Bolivia.

== Overview ==
The so-called Banzer Plan, worked out by the Bolivian Interior Ministry with the support of the United States Central Intelligence Agency, was developed in early 1975 and subsequently leaked to the church by an outraged government official. Colonel Hugo Banzer, then-ruler of Bolivia, portrayed himself as a defender of "Christian civilization." The targets included Jorge Manrique Hurtado, the archbishop of the Archdiocese of La Paz, and the suggested tactics involved planting documents on church premises and censoring or closing church properties and radio stations. In rural areas, parishes were raided, priests were arrested and expelled, and sometimes tortured and murdered.

The plan was endorsed by nine other Latin American governments in 1977.
