= Andrea Bernardo Schierhoff =

Andrew Bernard Schierhoff
- Auxiliary Bishop of La Paz, Bolivia
- Installed: November 11, 1968
- Term ended: December 12, 1982

Orders
- Ordination: April 14, 1948
- Consecration: January 2, 1969

Personal details
- Born: February 10, 1922 St. Louis, Missouri
- Died: December 1, 1986 (aged 64)
- Denomination: Roman Catholic

Andrew Bernardo Schierhoff (February 10, 1922 – December 1, 1986) was a Roman Catholic bishop who served as an auxiliary bishop of the Archdiocese of La Paz in Bolivia.

== Biography ==
Born in St. Louis, Missouri, Schierhoff was ordained to the priesthood on April 14, 1948, for the Roman Catholic Archdiocese of St. Louis.

On November 11, 1968, Schierhoff was appointed auxiliary bishop of La Paz and titular bishop of Pumentum. He was consecrated bishop on January 2, 1969.

On December 12, 1982, he was appointed Prelate of Pando. He died while in office.

Catholic Church titles
Preceded by Thomas Patrick Collins	Bishop of Pando; 1982–1986	Succeeded by Luis Morgan Casey
Preceded by –	Auxiliary Bishop of La Paz; 1969–1982	Succeeded by –
