= Apostolic Vicariate of Reyes =

Catholic missionary jurisdiction in Bolivia

Apostolic Vicariate of Reyes Apostolicus Reyesensis Vicariato Apostólico de Reyes

Location
- Country: Bolivia
- Ecclesiastical province: Immediately exempt to the Holy See

Statistics
- Area: 60,006 km^{2} (23,168 sq mi)
- Population: Total; Catholics: (as of 2010); 150,000; 112,000 (74.7%)
- Parishes: 15

Information
- Denomination: Catholic Church
- Sui iuris church: Latin Church
- Rite: Roman Rite
- Established: 1 September 1942 (84 years ago)
- Cathedral: Cathedral of the Holy Kings in Reyes

Current leadership
- Pope: Leo XIV
- Vicar Apostolic: Vacant
- Apostolic Administrator: Eugenio Coter

Map

The Vicariate Apostolic of Reyes (Latin: Apostolicus Vicariatus Niuflensis) is a Latin Church missionary ecclesiastical territory apostolic vicariate of the Catholic Church in Bolivia. Its cathedra is located in the episcopal see of Reyes.

== History ==
On 1 September 1942 Pope Pius XII established the Vicariate Apostolic of Reyes from the Vicariate Apostolic of El Beni.

== Apostolic Vicars ==
- Giovanni Claudel, C.Ss.R. † (14 July 1943 – 12 December 1955) Died
- José Alfonso Tscherrig, C.Ss.R. † (11 December 1956 – 11 December 1970) Resigned
- Roger-Émile Aubry, C.Ss.R. † (14 June 1973 – 1 May 1999) Resigned
- Carlos Bürgler, C.Ss.R. (1 May 1999 – 18 February 2019) Resigned
- Waldo Rubén Barrionuevo Ramírez, C.Ss.R. (1 June 2019 – 7 July 2022) Died
- Eugenio Coter, Apostolic Administrator (since 9 July 2022)

== Coadjutor ==
- Carlos Bürgler, C.Ss.R. (1977-1999), as Coadjutor Vicar Apostolic

== Auxiliary Bishop ==
- Waldo Rubén Barrionuevo Ramírez, C.Ss.R. (14 February 2014 – 1 June 2019)

== See also ==
- Roman Catholicism in Bolivia
