= Basilica of Our Lady of Copacabana =

Bolivian church

- Basilica Nuestra Señora de Copacabana
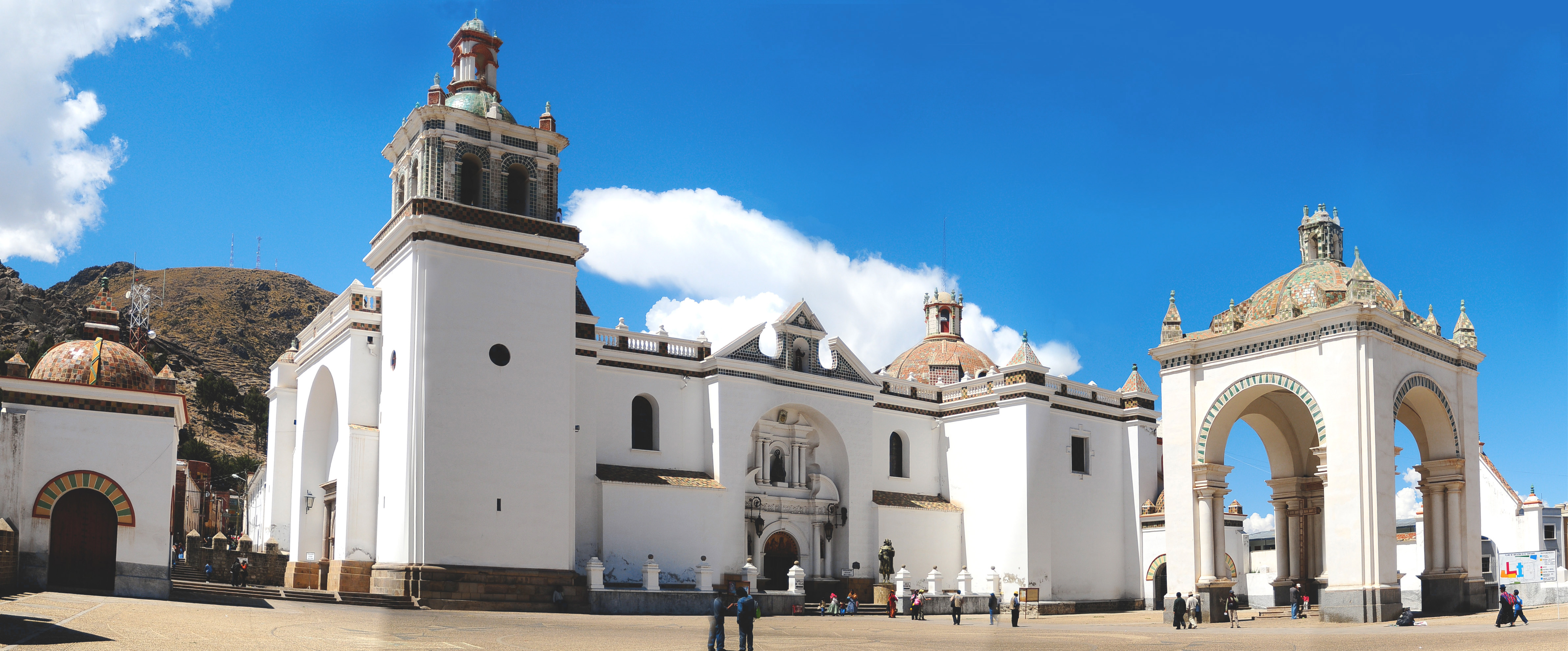

Religion
- Affiliation: Catholic Church
- Diocese: Diocese of El Alto
- Province: Manco Kapac
- Rite: Roman Rite

Location
- Location: Copacabana, Bolivia
- Municipality: Copacabana
- State: La Paz
- Interactive map of Basilica of Our Lady of Copacabana
- Coordinates: 16°10′00″S 69°05′07″W

Architecture
- Architect: Francisco Jiménez de Siguenza
- Style: Renaissance
- Groundbreaking: 1669
- Completed: 1679

Website
- Sitio Web

The Basilica of Our Lady of Copacabana is a 17th-century Roman Catholic shrine and basilica located in the town of Copacabana, Bolivia. The Marian shrine is dedicated to the Blessed Virgin Mary under the title of Our Lady of the Candles of Copacabana, patroness of Bolivia.

Pope Pius XII raised the shrine to the status of Minor Basilica via the Pontifical decree Bolivianæ Ditionis Intra on 2 July 1940.

== History ==
Around 1576, indigenous sculptor Francisco Tito Yupanqui carved an image of Our Lady of Copacabana. It was brought to Copacabana. Soon miracles were attributed to the intercession of the Blessed Virgin. An adobe shrine constructed about 1583. The shrine was constructed at the foot of a small, steep, hill in a location formerly known as the Temple of the Sun – an area sacred to the Inca – it remains as one of two principle sacred places to both the indigenous peoples and Catholics alike; the other location being the Virgin of Urkupiña near Cochabamba, Bolivia. In 1589, friars of the Order of Saint Augustine were entrusted with the management of the shrine, establishing a monastery and maintaining a detailed record of the Virgin's miracles.

The Augustinians built their first chapel between the 1614 and 1618. The current building was built between 1669 and 1679 by the Spanish architect Francisco Jiménez de Siguenza replacing the former church. It was officially elevated to the rank of Basilica in 1940.

== Hilltop Calvary ==
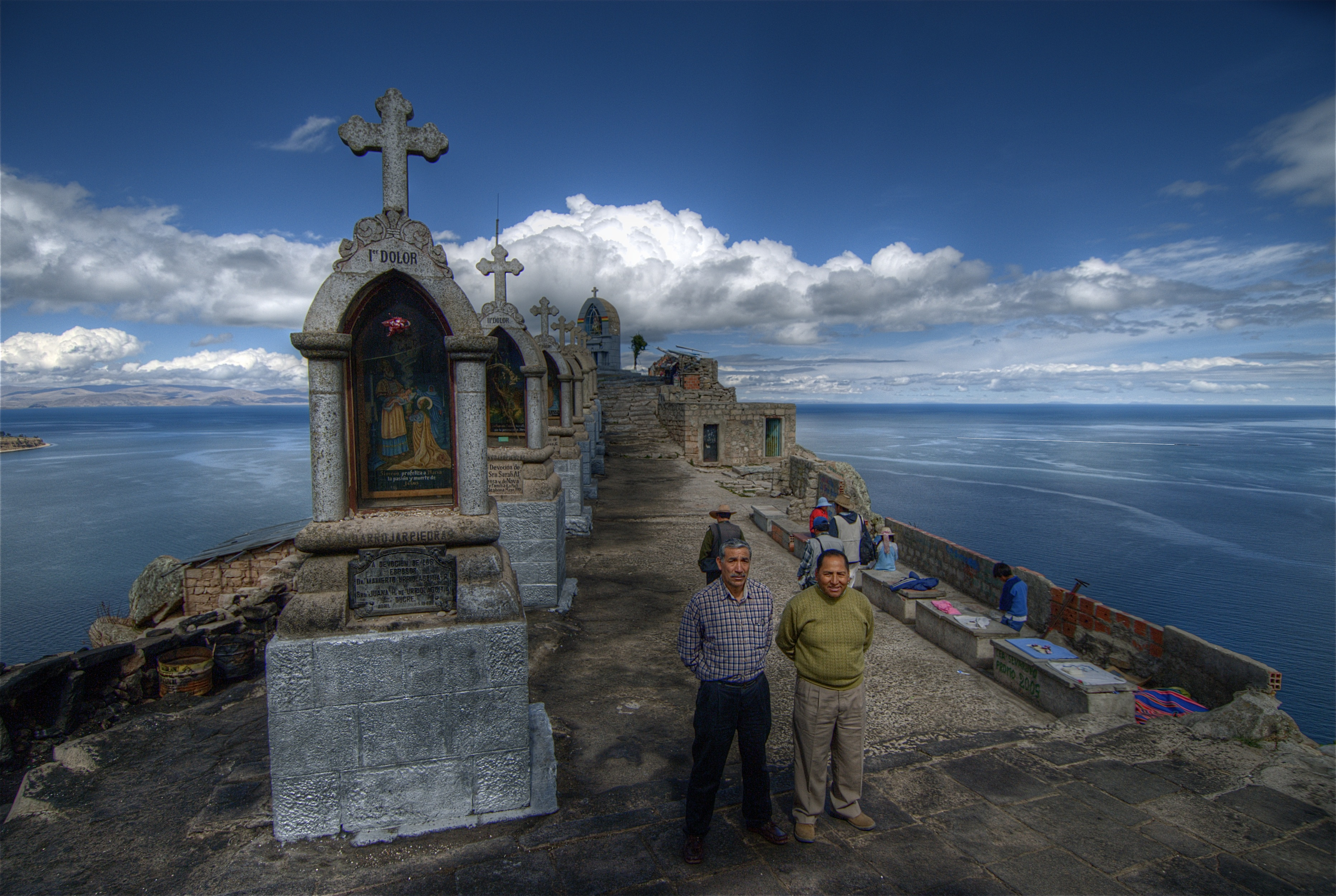
Calvario above Copacabana

The hilltop overlooking Lake Titicaca was rededicated as a "calvario" or replica of Calvary and is topped by the Stations of the Seven Sorrows of Mary and an altar with a depiction of the crucifixion of Jesus. It is a major centre of worship throughout the region during Holy Week, especially on Good Friday and Easter Sunday.

== Burglary (2013) ==
In the early hours of Monday, 22 April 2013, the Basilica of Our Lady of Copacabana was robbed and the image of the Virgen de Copacabana was stripped of her gold and silver accessories. Initial reports indicate that twenty-eight items, including the sculpture of the baby Jesus, were removed from the Virgen de Copacabana by thieves who entered the building using a ladder stolen from a nearby telecommunications station.
