= Alonso Manuel Escalante =

Roman Catholic bishop (1906–1967)

Alonso Manuel Escalante M.M.
- Vicar Apostolic of Pando
- Church: Catholic Church
- Province: Apostolic Vicariate of Pando
- In office: 13 January 1943 – 6 December 1960
- Predecessor: Vicariate established
- Successor: Thomas Patrick Collins
- Other post: Titular Bishop of Sora (1943-1967)

Orders
- Ordination: 1 February 1931 by John Joseph Dunn
- Consecration: 9 May 1943 by Luis María Martínez

Personal details
- Born: 24 December 1906 Mérida, Yucatán, Mexico
- Died: 21 June 1967 (aged 60) Hong Kong, British Empire

Alonso Manuel Escalante (24 December 1906 - 21 June 1967) was a Roman Catholic prelate and missionary, in South America. He was also known as the "Vagabond of God."

== Overview ==
Escalante was born in Mexico and was ordained as a member of the Maryknoll Missionaries.

Escalante served in the US, China, Mexico, Bolivia and Guadalupe. He was instrumental in the foundation of the Missionaries of Guadalupe, which in turn led to the creation of the Intercontinental University. He was ordained as a bishop in the Old Basilica of Our Lady of Guadalupe. He was then invited, with the consent of Pius XII, to return to Mexico to found, and be rector of, the Mexican Seminary of Missions.

== Biography ==
Alonso Manuel Escalante was born in Mérida, Yucatán, Mexico, in 1906 and was the third of eleven children. He emigrated to New Jersey, U.S. when he was nine years old. At the age of 13, after reading ‘’the life of Blessed Gabriel Perboyre’’, he decided to become a missionary and he entered Maryknoll Preparatory Seminary in 1920. He was ordained a priest as a member of the Maryknoll Missionaries on February 1, 1931.

He taught Algebra and French for a year in the Maryknoll Venard Seminary. He then travelled to Fushin, China where he worked as a missionary for eight years.

He returned to the U.S. as a professor at Maryknoll Seminary in 1940. At this time, Maryknoll was asked by the Vatican to establish a vicariate in the Amazon area of Bolivia. Escalante then led the first group of 17 Maryknollers to the Pando in Bolivia.

In 1942, the Vatican named him the Vicar Apostolic of the Pando, and the following year, he was ordained a bishop of Sora.

In 1948, the bishops of Mexico asked Maryknoll for Escalante's help in the development of their own foreign mission society, which he accepted. He became the first rector of the “Mexican Society for Foreign Missions (SMME)”, later to be known as the “Guadalupe Fathers”. He travelled to Tlalpan and began building a seminary there. The first priest graduated in 1950. That first year he also started publishing a magazine, ‘Almas’ which is still running in 2022.

Escalante was the Mexican National Director of the Pontifical Mission Aid Societies, a member of the Commission and Post-Conciliar Commission on the Missions, and President of the Mexican Episcopal Commission on the Missions.

Bishop Escalante served the rest of his career with the Guadalupe Fathers. In June 1967 he and went to Hong Kong to help secure mission territory for them. While in Hong Kong, he caught typhoid fever and died. The date of his death is given as both June 14 and June 21. He asked to have a funeral at Maryknoll headquarters in Ossining, New York, and to be buried in Mexico.

== The Vagabond of God ==
Escalante once described the life of a missionary as being similar to that of a vagabond but with notable differences. While a vagabond may not care where they are going, a missionary is aware of their destination and has a purpose. Both feel the need to keep moving, but a vagabond is driven by their own needs, while a missionary has a responsibility to spread the teachings of their faith. Mons. Alonso Manuel Escalante referred to missionaries as the "vagabonds of God."

== Legacy ==
As superior general of the Missionaries of Guadalupe, he organized and founded three missions in Japan, Korea and Kenya. He also ordained 48 missionaries.

The seminary became the Universidad Intercontinental (Intercontinental University, UIC) in 1976.
