= Francisco de la Serna =

Roman Catholic prelate

Most Reverend Francisco de la Serna
- Bishop of La Paz
- Church: Catholic Church
- Diocese: Diocese of La Paz
- In office: 1645–1647
- Predecessor: Alfonso de Franco y Luna
- Successor: Luis Antonio de Castro y Castillo
- Previous posts: Bishop of Paraguay (1635–1638); Bishop of Popayán (1638–1645)

Orders
- Ordination: 9 June 1596
- Consecration: 15 November 1637 by Hernando de Arias y Ugarte

Personal details
- Born: 1568 Huanuco, Viceroyalty of Peru, Spanish Empire
- Died: April 1647 (age 79) La Paz, Bolivia

Francisco de la Serna, O.E.S.A. (1568 – April 1647) was a Roman Catholic prelate who served as Bishop of La Paz (1645–1647), Bishop of Popayán (1638–1645), and Bishop of Paraguay (1635–1638).

== Biography ==
Francisco de la Serna was born in Huanuco, Peru in 1568 and ordained a priest in the Order of Hermits of Saint Augustine on 9 June 1596. On 17 December 1635, he was appointed during the papacy of Pope Urban VIII as Bishop of Paraguay. On 15 November 1637, he was consecrated bishop by Hernando de Arias y Ugarte, Archbishop of Lima, assisted by Father Pedro de Ortega y Sotomayor. On 14 June 1638, he was appointed during the papacy of Pope Urban VIII as Bishop of Popayán. On 19 January 1645, he was selected by the King of Spain and confirmed by Pope Innocent X on 21 August 1645 as Bishop of La Paz. He died in April 1647.

While bishop, he was the principal consecrator of Gaspar de Villarroel, Bishop of Santiago de Chile (1638); and the principal co-consecrator of Bartolomé de Benavente y Benavides, Bishop of Antequera, Oaxaca (1640).

== External links and additional sources ==
- Cheney, David M. "Archdiocese of La Paz". Catholic-Hierarchy.org. (for Chronology of Bishops) ^{[self-published]}
- Chow, Gabriel. "Metropolitan Archdiocese of La Paz (Bolivia)". GCatholic.org. (for Chronology of Bishops) ^{[self-published]}
- Cheney, David M. "Diocese of Popayán". Catholic-Hierarchy.org. (for Chronology of Bishops) ^{[self-published]}
- Chow, Gabriel. "Metropolitan Diocese of Popayán (Colombia)". GCatholic.org. (for Chronology of Bishops) ^{[self-published]}
- Cheney, David M. "Archdiocese of Asunción". Catholic-Hierarchy.org. (for Chronology of Bishops) ^{[self-published]}
- Chow, Gabriel. "Metropolitan Archdiocese of Asunción (Paraguay)". GCatholic.org. (for Chronology of Bishops) ^{[self-published]}

Catholic Church titles
Preceded by Cristóbal de Aresti Martínez de Aguilar	Bishop of Paraguay; 1635–1638	Succeeded by Bernardino de Cárdenas Ponce
Preceded by Diego Montoya Mendoza	Bishop of Popayán; 1638–1645	Succeeded by Vasco Jacinto de Contreras y Valverde
Preceded by Alfonso de Franco y Luna	Bishop of La Paz; 1645–1647	Succeeded by Luis Antonio de Castro y Castillo
