= Juan Pérez de la Serna =

Spanish Catholic prelate (1570–1631)

Most Reverend Juan Pérez de la Serna
- Archbishop (personal title) of Zamora
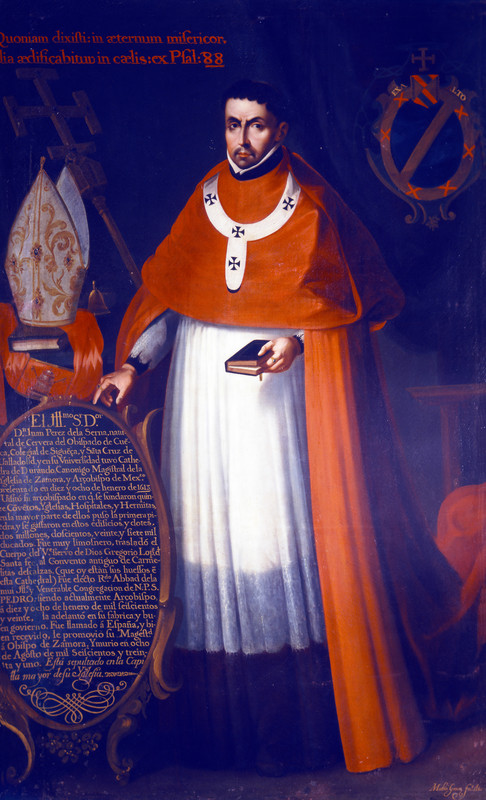
- Church: Catholic Church
- Diocese: Diocese of Zamora
- Predecessor: Juan Roco Campofrío
- Successor: Diego Zúñiga Sotomayor
- Previous post: Archbishop of Mexico (1613–1627)

Personal details
- Born: 1570 Cervera, Spain
- Died: 8 August 1631 (aged 60–61)

Juan Pérez de la Serna (1570 – 8 August 1631) was a Spanish Catholic prelate who served as Archbishop of Zamora (1627–1631) and as the seventh Archbishop of Mexico (1613–1627).

== Biography ==
Juan Pérez de la Serna was born in Cervera del Llano, Spain. On 13 May 1613 he was appointed by the King of Spain and confirmed by Pope Paul V as the seventh Archbishop of Mexico. On 19 July 1627 he was appointed by Pope Urban VIII as Archbishop (personal title) of the Diocese of Zamora, Spain where he served until his death on 8 August 1631. He died in Zamora, Spain.

== Episcopal succession ==
While bishop, he was the principal consecrator of:

- Diego de Contreras (1613), Archbishop of Santo Domingo;
- Miguel García Serrano (1617), Bishop of Nueva Segovia;
- Francisco de Rivera y Pareja (1618), Bishop of Guadalajara;
- Gonzalo Hernandez y Hermosillo y Gonzalez (1621), Bishop of Durango;
- Luis de Cañizares (1624), Bishop of Nueva Caceres;
- Gutiérrez Bernardo de Quirós (1626), Bishop of Tlaxcala;

and principal co-consecrator of:

- Sebastião de Matos de Noronha (1626), Bishop of Elvas.

== See also ==
- Diego Carrillo de Mendoza y Pimentel for his dispute with the viceroy of New Spain

== External links and additional sources ==
- Cheney, David M. "Diocese of Zamora". Catholic-Hierarchy.org. (for Chronology of Bishops) ^{[self-published]}
- Chow, Gabriel. "Diocese of Zamora (Spain)". GCatholic.org. (for Chronology of Bishops) ^{[self-published]}
- Cheney, David M. "Archdiocese of México". Catholic-Hierarchy.org. (for Chronology of Bishops) ^{[self-published]}
- Chow, Gabriel. "Metropolitan Archdiocese of México". GCatholic.org. (for Chronology of Bishops) ^{[self-published]}
- (in Spanish) List of Archbishops of Mexico

Catholic Church titles
Preceded by García Guerra	Archbishop of Mexico; 1613–1627	Succeeded by Francisco de Manso Zuñiga y Sola
Preceded by Juan Roco Campofrío	Archbishop of Zamora; 1627–1631	Succeeded by Diego Zúñiga Sotomayor
