= Pedro de Valencia (bishop) =

Most Reverend Pedro de Valencia
- Bishop of La Paz
- Church: Catholic Church
- Diocese: Diocese of La Paz
- In office: 1617–1631
- Predecessor: Domingo Valderrama y Centeno
- Successor: Feliciano de la Vega Padilla
- Previous post: Bishop of Santiago de Guatemala (1615–1617)

Orders
- Consecration: 1616 by Bartolomé Lobo Guerrero

Personal details
- Died: 1631 La Paz, Bolivia

Pedro de Valencia (died 1631) was a Roman Catholic prelate who served as Bishop of La Paz (1617–1631) and Bishop of Santiago de Guatemala (1615–1617).

De Valencia was born in Lima, Peru. On 28 September 1615, he was appointed during the papacy of Pope Paul V as Bishop of Santiago de Guatemala. In 1616, he was consecrated bishop by Bartolomé Lobo Guerrero, Archbishop of Lima. On 30 July 1617, he was appointed during the papacy of Pope Paul V as Bishop of La Paz. He served as Bishop of La Paz until his death in 1631.

== External links and additional sources ==
- Cheney, David M. "Archdiocese of Guatemala". Catholic-Hierarchy.org. (for Chronology of Bishops) ^{[self-published]}
- Chow, Gabriel. "Metropolitan Archdiocese of Santiago de Guatemala". GCatholic.org. (for Chronology of Bishops) ^{[self-published]}
- Cheney, David M. "Archdiocese of La Paz". Catholic-Hierarchy.org. (for Chronology of Bishops) ^{[self-published]}
- Chow, Gabriel. "Metropolitan Archdiocese of La Paz (Bolivia)". GCatholic.org. (for Chronology of Bishops) ^{[self-published]}

Catholic Church titles
Preceded by Juan de las Cabezas Altamirano	Bishop of Santiago de Guatemala; 1615–1617	Succeeded by Juan de Zapata y Sandoval
Preceded by Domingo Valderrama y Centeno	Bishop of La Paz; 1617–1631	Succeeded by Feliciano de la Vega Padilla
