= Alfonso de Franco y Luna =

Spanish Catholic bishop (1572–1645)

Most Reverend Alfonso de Franco y Luna
- Bishop of La Paz
- Church: Catholic Church
- Diocese: Diocese of La Paz
- In office: 1639–1645
- Predecessor: Feliciano de la Vega Padilla
- Successor: Francisco de la Serna
- Previous post: Bishop of Durango (1632–1639)

Orders
- Consecration: 31 October 1632 by Francisco Sánchez Villanueva y Vega

Personal details
- Born: 1572 Alcalá de Henares, Spain
- Died: 1645 (age 73) La Paz, Bolivia

Alfonso de Franco y Luna (1572–1645) was a Catholic prelate who served as Bishop of La Paz (1639–1645) and Bishop of Durango (1632–1639).

== Biography ==
Alfonso de Franco y Luna was born in 1572 in Alcalá de Henares, Spain. On 7 June 1632, he was appointed during the papacy of Pope Urban VIII as Bishop of Durango. On 31 October 1632, he was consecrated bishop by Francisco Sánchez Villanueva y Vega, Bishop of Mazara del Vallo, with Juan Barahona Zapata del Águila, Bishop of Nicaragua, and Cristóforo Chrisostome Carletti, Bishop of Termia, serving as co-consecrators. On 30 May 1639, he was appointed during the papacy of Pope Urban VIII as Bishop of La Paz. He served as Bishop of La Paz until his death in 1645.

== External links and additional sources ==
- Cheney, David M. "Archdiocese of Durango". Catholic-Hierarchy.org. (for Chronology of Bishops) ^{[self-published]}
- Chow, Gabriel. "Archdiocese of Durango (Mexico)". GCatholic.org. (for Chronology of Bishops) ^{[self-published]}
- Cheney, David M. "Archdiocese of La Paz". Catholic-Hierarchy.org. (for Chronology of Bishops) ^{[self-published]}
- Chow, Gabriel. "Metropolitan Archdiocese of La Paz (Bolivia)". GCatholic.org. (for Chronology of Bishops) ^{[self-published]}

Catholic Church titles
Preceded by Gonzalo Hernandez y Hermosillo y Gonzalez	Bishop of Durango; 1632–1639	Succeeded by Francisco Diego Díaz de Quintanilla y de Hevía y Valdés
Preceded by Feliciano de la Vega Padilla	Bishop of La Paz; 1639–1645	Succeeded by Francisco de la Serna
