= Waldo Rubén Barrionuevo Ramírez =

Bolivian Roman Catholic bishop (1967–2022)

His Excellency Waldo Rubén Barrionuevo Ramírez
- Vicar Apostolic of Reyes
- Appointed: 1 June 2019
- Term ended: 7 July 2022
- Predecessor: Carlos Bürgler
- Previous posts: Auxiliary Bishop of Reyes and Titular Bishop of Vulturaria (2014–2019)

Orders
- Ordination: 25 October 1997
- Consecration: 14 May 2014 by Carlos Bürgler

Personal details
- Born: 9 September 1967 Oruro, Bolivia
- Died: 7 July 2022 (aged 54) La Paz, Bolivia
- Motto: ADVENIAT REGNUM TUUM
- Coat of arms

Styles of Waldo Rubén Barrionuevo Ramırez
- Reference style: His Excellency; The Most Reverend
- Spoken style: Your Excellency
- Religious style: Bishop

Waldo Rubén Barrionuevo Ramírez (9 September 1967 – 7 July 2022) was a Bolivian Roman Catholic bishop.

Barrionuevo Ramirez was born in Bolivia and was ordained to the priesthood in 1997. He served as auxiliary bishop and Vicar Apostolic of the Apostolic Vicariate of Reyes from 2014 until his death in 2022.

Catholic Church titles
Preceded by Carlos Bürgler	Vicar Apostolic of Reyes; 2019–2022	Succeeded by Sede vacante
Preceded by Thomas John Joseph Paprocki	Titular Bishop of Vulturaria; 2014–2019	Succeeded by Javier Herrera Corona
Preceded by —	Auxiliary Bishop of Reyes; 2014–2019	Succeeded by —
