= Nicolás Armentia Ugarte =

Spanish Franciscan Bishop

Nicolás Armentia Ugarte (Bemedo, Spain, 5 December 1845 – 24 November 1909) was a Spanish Franciscan Bishop of La Paz, Bolivia, appointed 22 October 1901.

== Life ==
Before coming to South America, he spent several years in France, and had studied science. As a missionary he was under the guidance of Rafael Sans, pioneer in the forests and on the river courses of the Beni region.

The indigenous people there were not numerous, but often hostile, and had for years been decimated by smallpox. To reach them he cut his way through from one abandoned hamlet to another, exposed to hardship from hunger, climate, and disease. He taught and preached wherever and whenever he fell in with Indians, establishing and re-establishing missions; in this way he gathered materials for the geography, natural history, and anthropology of these regions.

== Works ==
His principal publications are:

- Diario del Viage al Madre de Dios, hecho por el P. Fray Nicolás Armentia, en el año de mil ochocientos ochenta y cuatro y mil ochocientos ochenta y cinco, en calidad de comisionado para explorar el Madrede Dios etc.; usually bound with Navegación del Madre de Dios (La Paz, 1887)
- Descripción de la Provincia de los Mojos, en el Reino del Perú (La Paz, 1888) -- the latter is a Spanish translation of the book of the Jesuit Franz Xavier Eder, Descriptio Provinciae Moxitarum (Buda, 1791)
- Vocabulario del Idioma Shipibo del Ucayali appeared in Boletín de la Sociedad geográfica de La Paz, I, No.1. This is thus far the most complete vocabulary of the Pano stock (see Arawaks), and embraces more than 3,800 words. Los Indios Mosetenes y su lengua was published at Buenos Aires, 1903.
