= Luis Morgan Casey =

Roman Catholic prelate (1935–2022)

His Excellency Luis Morgan Casey
- Apostolic Vicar Emeritus of Pando
- Appointed: January 18, 1988
- Term ended: February 2, 2013
- Predecessor: Andrea Bernardo Schierhoff
- Successor: Eugenio Coter
- Other post: Titular Bishop of Mibiarca (1983–2022)
- Previous post: Auxiliary Bishop of La Paz (1983–1988)

Orders
- Ordination: April 7, 1962 by Cardinal Joseph Ritter
- Consecration: January 28, 1984 by Archbishop Alfio Rapisarda

Personal details
- Born: June 23, 1935 Portageville, Missouri, U.S.
- Died: July 27, 2022 (aged 87) St. Louis, Missouri, U.S.
- Denomination: Roman Catholic

Styles of Luis Morgan Casey
- Reference style: His Excellency; The Most Reverend
- Spoken style: Your Excellency
- Religious style: Bishop

Luis Morgan Casey (June 23, 1935 – July 27, 2022) was an American prelate of the Roman Catholic Church bishop who served as an auxiliary bishop of the Archdiocese of La Paz in Bolivia. He also served as the vicar apostolic to the Catholic mission in the Pando Department in Bolivia.

== Biography ==
Born in Portageville, Missouri, Casey was ordained a priest by Cardinal Joseph Ritter for the Archdiocese of Saint Louis on April 7, 1962. In 1965, Casey went to Bolivia to serve in an archdiocesan mission at the headwaters of the Amazon River.

On November 3, 1983, Casey was appointed titular bishop of Mirbiarca and auxiliary bishop of the Archdiocese of La Paz. He was consecrated in La Paz on January 28, 1984 by Archbishop Alfio Rapisarda, the apostolic nuncio to Bolivia. On January 18, 1988, Casey was appointed vicar apostolic of Pando. Casey retired as vicar apostolic on February 2, 2013, returning to St. Louis.

In 2019, Casey commented on a recent Synod of the Amazon that was held by the Vatican. He criticized the participants for not addressing the deforestation and other environmental damage being inflicted on the Amazon Basin by mining and farming interests.

Catholic Church titles
Preceded by Andrea Bernardo Schierhoff	Apostolic Vicar of Pando; 1988–2013	Succeeded by Eugenio Coter
Preceded by José Oscar Barahona Castillo	Titular Bishop of Mibiarca; 1983–2022	Succeeded by Sede vacante
Preceded by –	Auxiliary Bishop of La Paz; 1984–1988	Succeeded by –
