= Juan de Zapata y Sandoval =

Most Reverend Juan de Zapata y Sandoval
- Bishop of Chiapas
- Church: Catholic Church
- Diocese: Diocese of Santiago de Guatemala
- In office: 1621–1630
- Predecessor: Pedro de Valencia
- Successor: Agustín de Ugarte y Sarabia
- Previous post: Bishop of Chiapas (1613–1621)

Orders
- Consecration: 23 November 1613 by Alfonso de la Mota y Escobar

Personal details
- Born: 1545 Mexico
- Died: 9 January 1630 (aged 84–85) Guatemala

Juan de Zapata y Sandoval, O.S.A. (1545 – 9 January 1630) was a Roman Catholic prelate who served as Bishop of Santiago de Guatemala (1621–1630) and Bishop of Chiapas (1613–1621).

== Biography ==
Juan de Zapata y Sandoval was born in 1545 in México and ordained a priest in the Order of Saint Augustine. On 13 November 1613, he was appointed during the papacy of Pope Paul V as Bishop of Chiapas. On 23 November 1613, he was consecrated bishop by Alfonso de la Mota y Escobar, Bishop of Tlaxcala. On 13 September 1621, he was appointed during the papacy of Pope Gregory XV as Bishop of Santiago de Guatemala. He served as Bishop of Santiago de Guatemala until his death on 9 January 1630.

== External links and additional sources ==
- Cheney, David M. "Diocese of San Cristóbal de Las Casas". Catholic-Hierarchy.org. (for Chronology of Bishops) ^{[self-published]}
- Chow, Gabriel. "Diocese of San Cristóbal de Las Casas". GCatholic.org. (for Chronology of Bishops) ^{[self-published]}
- Cheney, David M. "Archdiocese of Guatemala". Catholic-Hierarchy.org. (for Chronology of Bishops) ^{[self-published]}
- Chow, Gabriel. "Metropolitan Archdiocese of Santiago de Guatemala". GCatholic.org. (for Chronology of Bishops) ^{[self-published]}

Catholic Church titles
Preceded by Juan Tomás de Blanes	Bishop of Chiapas; 1613–1621	Succeeded by Bernardino de Salazar y Frías
Preceded by Pedro de Valencia	Bishop of Santiago de Guatemala; 1621–1630	Succeeded by Agustín de Ugarte y Sarabia
