= Feliciano de la Vega Padilla =

Spanish Roman Catholic prelate

Most Reverend Feliciano de la Vega Padilla
- Archbishop of Mexico
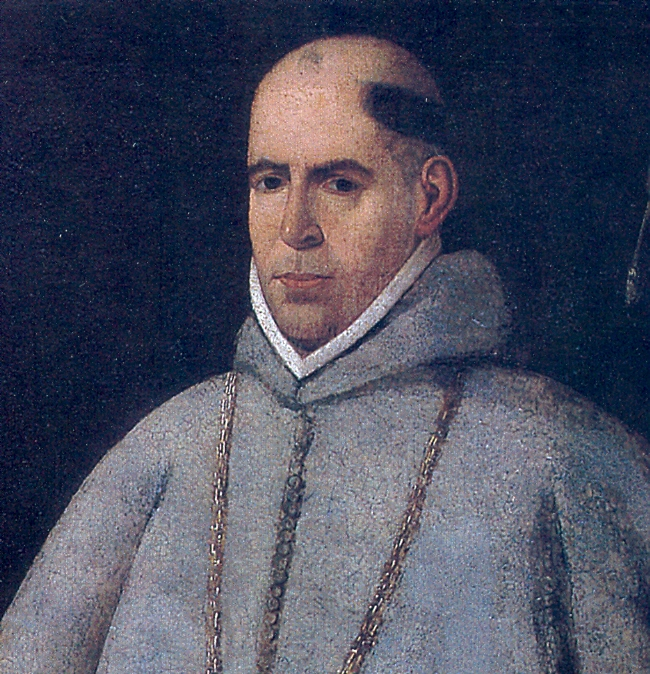
- Church: Catholic Church
- Archdiocese: Archdiocese of Mexico
- Predecessor: Francisco Verdugo Cabrera
- Successor: Juan de Mañozca y Zamora
- Previous posts: Bishop of Popayán (1631–1633); Bishop of La Paz (1633–1638)

Orders
- Consecration: December 21, 1631 by Hernando de Arias y Ugarte

Personal details
- Born: 1582 Lima
- Died: December 1640 (aged 57–58) Mazatlán

Feliciano de la Vega Padilla (1582 – December 1640) was a Roman Catholic prelate who served as Archbishop of Mexico (1638–1640), Bishop of La Paz (1633–1638), and Bishop of Popayán (1631–1633).

== Biography ==
On February 10, 1631, Feliciano de la Vega Padilla was selected by the King of Spain and confirmed by Pope Urban VIII as Bishop of Popayán. On December 21, 1631, he was consecrated bishop by Hernando de Arias y Ugarte, Archbishop of Lima. On September 5, 1633, he was selected by the King of Spain and confirmed by Pope Urban VIII as Bishop of La Paz. On September 13, 1638, he was selected by the King of Spain and confirmed by Pope Urban VIII as Archbishop of Mexico where he served until his death in December 1640.

While bishop, he was the principal consecrator of Diego de Zambrana de Villalobos y Cordero, Bishop of Concepción (1636); and principal co-consecrator of Pedro de Villagómez Vivanco, Bishop of Arequipa (1633).

== External links and additional sources ==
- Cheney, David M. "Diocese of Popayán". Catholic-Hierarchy.org. (for Chronology of Bishops) ^{[self-published]}
- Chow, Gabriel. "Metropolitan Diocese of Popayán (Colombia)". GCatholic.org. (for Chronology of Bishops) ^{[self-published]}
- Cheney, David M. "Archdiocese of La Paz". Catholic-Hierarchy.org. (for Chronology of Bishops) ^{[self-published]}
- Chow, Gabriel. "Metropolitan Archdiocese of La Paz (Bolivia)". GCatholic.org. (for Chronology of Bishops) ^{[self-published]}
- Cheney, David M. "Archdiocese of México". Catholic-Hierarchy.org. (for Chronology of Bishops) ^{[self-published]}
- Chow, Gabriel. "Metropolitan Archdiocese of México". GCatholic.org. (for Chronology of Bishops) ^{[self-published]}

Catholic Church titles
Preceded by Ambrosio Vallejo Mejía	Bishop of Popayán; 1631–1633	Succeeded by Diego Montoya Mendoza
Preceded by Pedro de Valencia	Bishop of La Paz; 1633–1638	Succeeded by Alfonso de Franco y Luna
Preceded by Francisco Verdugo Cabrera	Archbishop of Mexico; 1638–1640	Succeeded by Juan de Mañozca y Zamora
