= Juan Valle =

Most Reverend Juan Valle
- Bishop of Popayán
- Church: Catholic Church
- Diocese: Diocese of Popayán
- In office: 1546–1563
- Predecessor: None
- Successor: Agustín Gormaz Velasco

Orders
- Consecration: 1547

Personal details
- Born: Spain
- Died: 1563 France

Juan Valle or Juan del Valle (died 1563) was a Roman Catholic prelate who served as the first Bishop of Popayán (1546–1563).

== Biography ==
Juan del Valle was born in Spain. On 27 Aug 1546, Juan Valle was appointed during the papacy of Pope Paul III as Bishop of Popayán. In 1547, he was consecrated bishop in Spain. He served as Bishop of Popayán until his death in 1563 in France.

== External links and additional sources ==
- Cheney, David M. "Diocese of Popayán". Catholic-Hierarchy.org. (for Chronology of Bishops) ^{[self-published]}
- Chow, Gabriel. "Metropolitan Diocese of Popayán (Colombia)". GCatholic.org. (for Chronology of Bishops) ^{[self-published]}

Catholic Church titles
| Preceded by None | Bishop of Popayán; 1546–1563 | Succeeded by Agustín Gormaz Velasco |
