= Our Lady of Copacabana =

Marian title

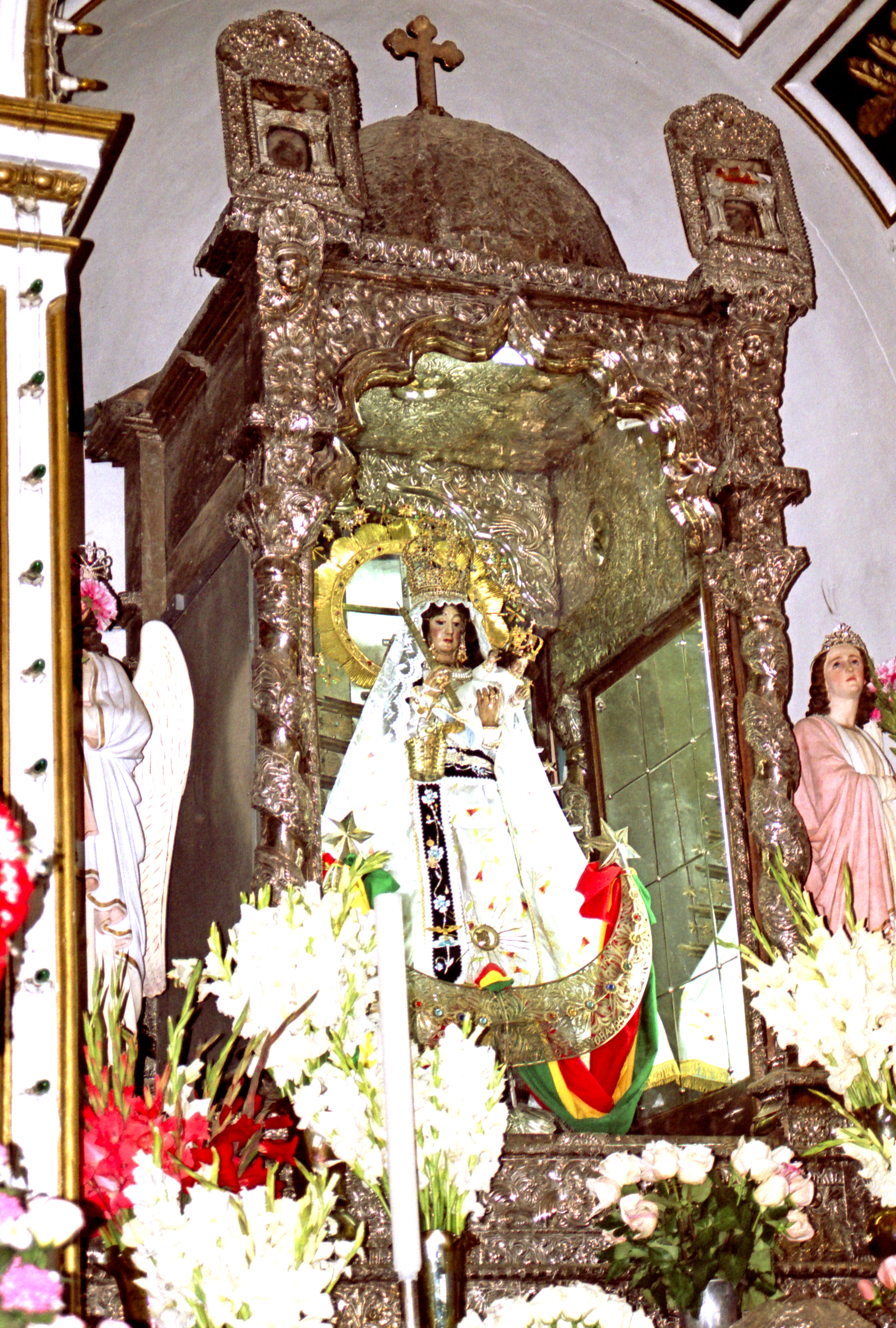
- Original statue of the Virgen de Copacabana in the Basilica
- Venerated in: Roman Catholic Church
- Major shrine: Basilica of Our Lady of Copacabana, Copacabana, Bolivia
- Feast: 2 February; 5 August
- Attributes: Incan dress and crown, Infant Jesus, candle, woven basket, pigeons, gold Quechua jewellery
- Patronage: Bolivia and Bolivian people, Bolivian Navy, National Police of Bolivia

Our Lady of the Candles of Copacabana is a Roman Catholic title of the Blessed Virgin Mary honored as the patron saint of Bolivia. She is venerated in Bolivia on 2 February, the Feast of the Feast of the Presentation of Jesus Christ. Another feast with its own liturgical texts is celebrated on 5 August.

Pope Pius XI granted the image a Pontifical decree of Canonical coronation on 29 July 1925. The rite of coronation was executed on 1 August the same year. Pope Pius XII later decreed her shrine a Basilica on 2 July 1940. Pope Paul VI issued the decree Maria Mater Ecclesiæ on 4 November 1968, which declared this title patroness of the entire Bolivian Navy.

== History ==
In the mid-16th century, the inhabitants of Copacabana were divided into two groups: Anansayas (Inca newcomers) and Urinsayas (the original residents of the area). Despite conversion to Christianity, the two groups were still attached to their original beliefs. Poor harvests led them to consider attracting heavenly favour through a new confraternity, with the Anansayas resolved to venerate the Blessed Virgin Mary while the Urinsayas selected Saint Sebastián .

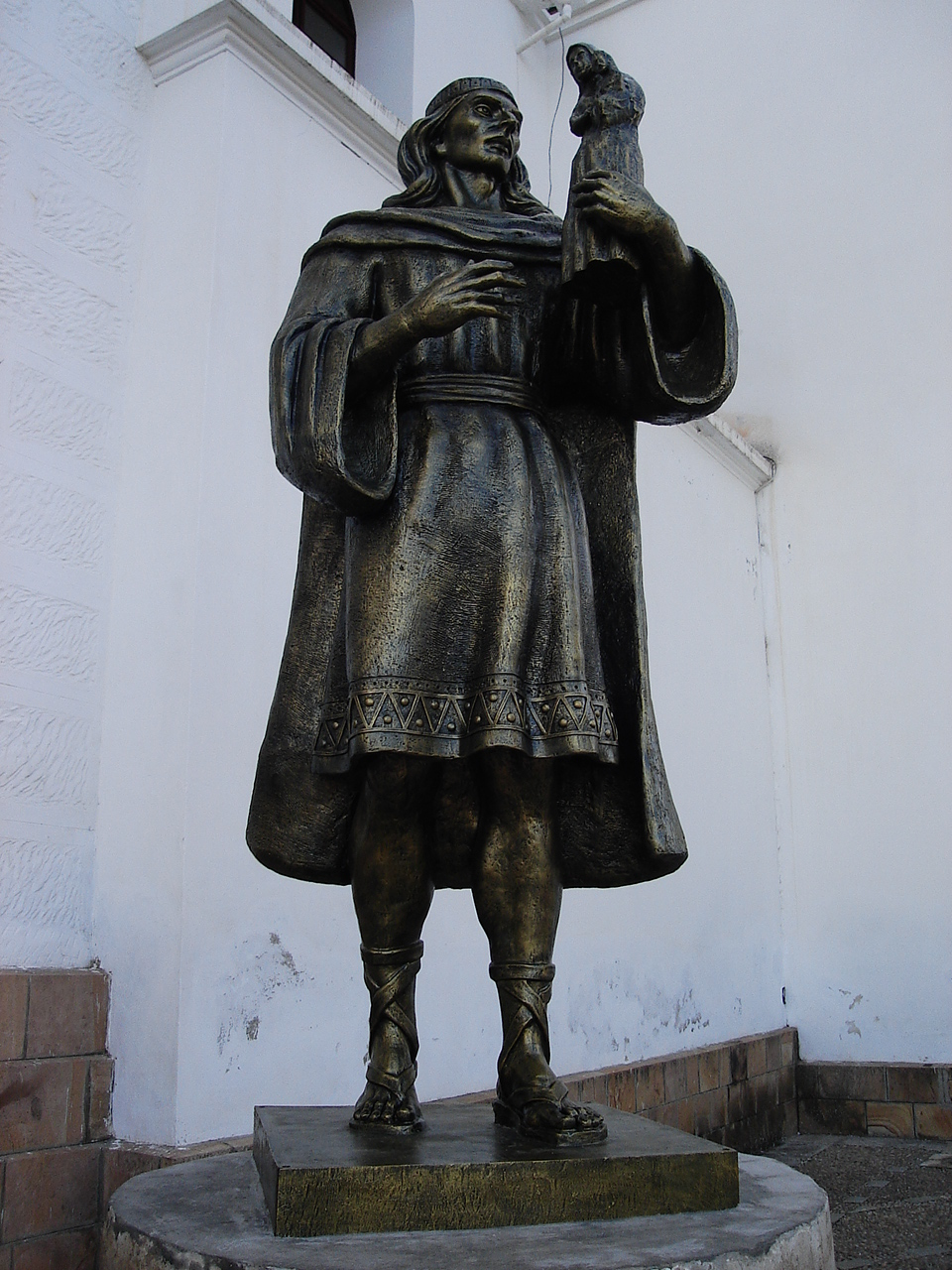
Statue of the sculptor Francisco Tito Yupanqui

The sculptor Francisco Tito Yupanqui crafted an image of the Virgin to influence the local people. Using clay and assisted by his brother Philip, Francisco Tito created the sculpture, which was placed at the side of the Copacabana church altar by its parish priest, Antonio de Almedio. After Almedio left the area, Antonio Montoro took over; unhappy with the coarse and disproportionate features of the image, he ordered it be removed from its place and hidden in a corner of the sacristy.

Francisco Tito was humbled by this, and upon the advice of relatives, went to Potosí where there were outstanding teachers of sacred image making. While studying in the workshop of Maestro Diego Ortíz, Francisco Tito gained expertise in sculpture and wood carving. He resolved to create an improved image of the Virgin with his new skills and while looking through the churches of Potosí for an image to serve as a model, he chose that of Our Lady of the Rosary in the convent of Santo Domingo. He studied it closely to remember details before starting his new piece, and had a Votive Mass of the Holy Trinity celebrated to ask for divine blessings upon his work.

The Urinsayas had meanwhile accepted establishment of the confraternity to the Virgin Mary preferred by the Anansayas, but they disliked Francisco Tito's carving and so decided to sell it. In La Paz, this reached the priest of Copacabana who decided he would bring the image to the people. On 2 February 1583, the image of Mary was brought to the hills of Guaçu. A series of miracles attributed to the icon made it one of the oldest Marian shrines in the Americas, along with that of Our Lady of Guadalupe in Mexico.

On August 1, 1925, during the visit of Pope Pius XI to Bolivia, the image of the Virgin of Copacabana was blessed and granted a canonical coronation. Attending the coronation were three Bolivian bishops, President Bautista Saavedra, and ambassadors representing Argentina and Peru.

== Construction of the basilica ==
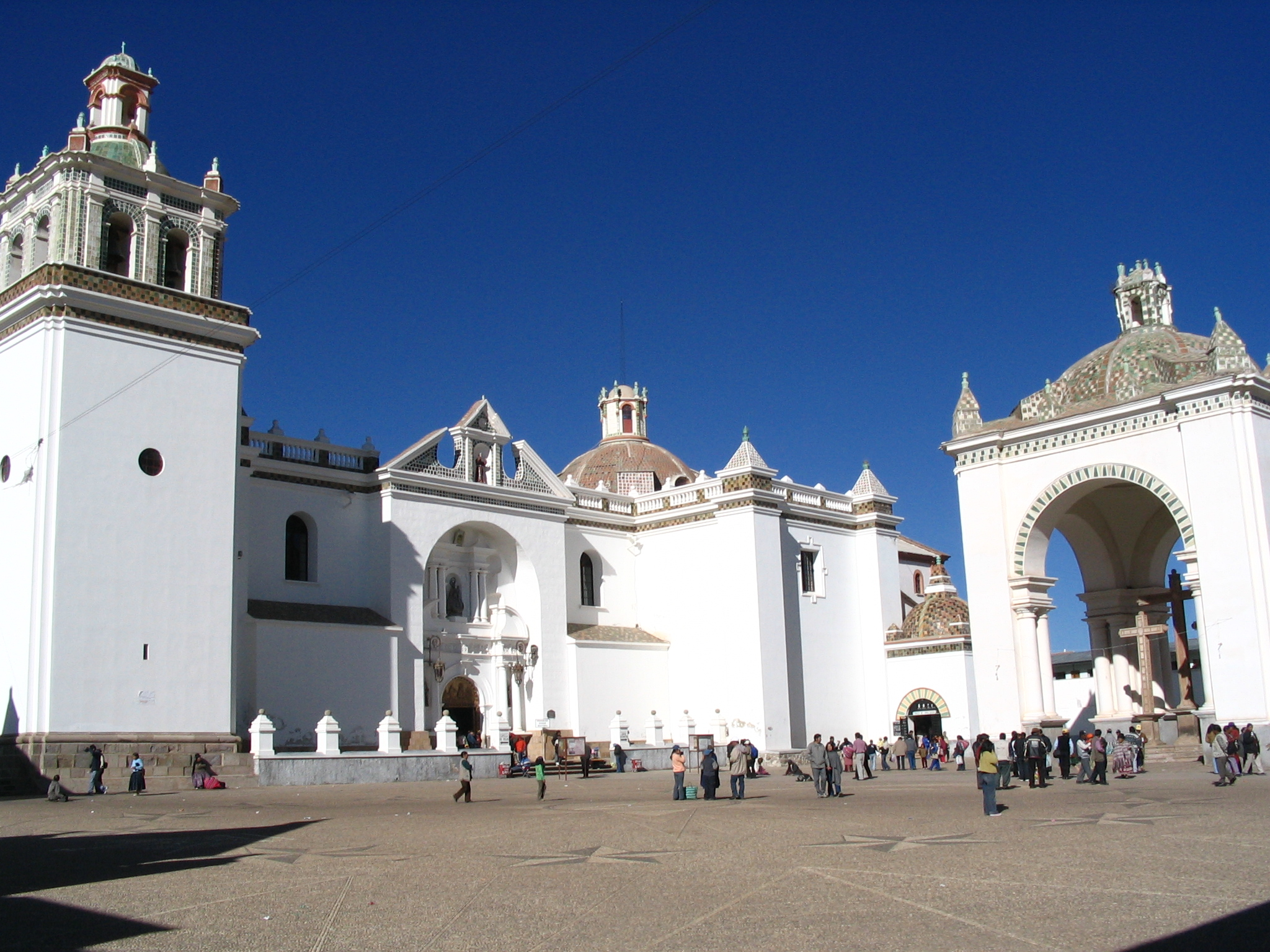
Church of Copacabana

From its beginning, the image gained a reputation for being a miracle. The Augustinians built their first chapel between the 1614 and 1618, and later, the Viceroy of Peru morally and financially supported the construction of a basilica to honor the Virgin. Construction of the Basilica of Our Lady of Copacabana began in 1668, was inaugurated in 1678, and was completed by 1805. Subsequently, the faithful donated embellishments to the image, including valuable jewels, and the temple was filled with gifts and treasures.

In 1825, when Bolivia gained independence, it was attributed to the faith of the population through the Virgin of Copacabana. However, in 1826, Marshal Antonio José de Sucre, the President of the Republic of Bolivia, expropriated all the jewels and colonial treasures at the Shrine of the Virgin, using them to create the first coins from Bolivia.

== Carving description ==
The body of the image measures about four feet, carved from maguey wood, and laminated in gold leaf. The clothes are that of an Inca princess, and the basic form is covered in luxurious robes and dresses, with the head wearing a wig of long, natural hair. The Virgin holds the Christ Child with her left arm, in a peculiar position as if he is about to fall. In her right arm is a basket and a gold candle, which was a gift and souvenir of the 1669 visit by the Viceroy of Peru.

The original image never leaves its shrine, and a replica is used for processions. Devotees leaving the shrine customarily walk backwards towards the door, to avoid turning their backs on the Virgin.

== Devotion in other regions ==
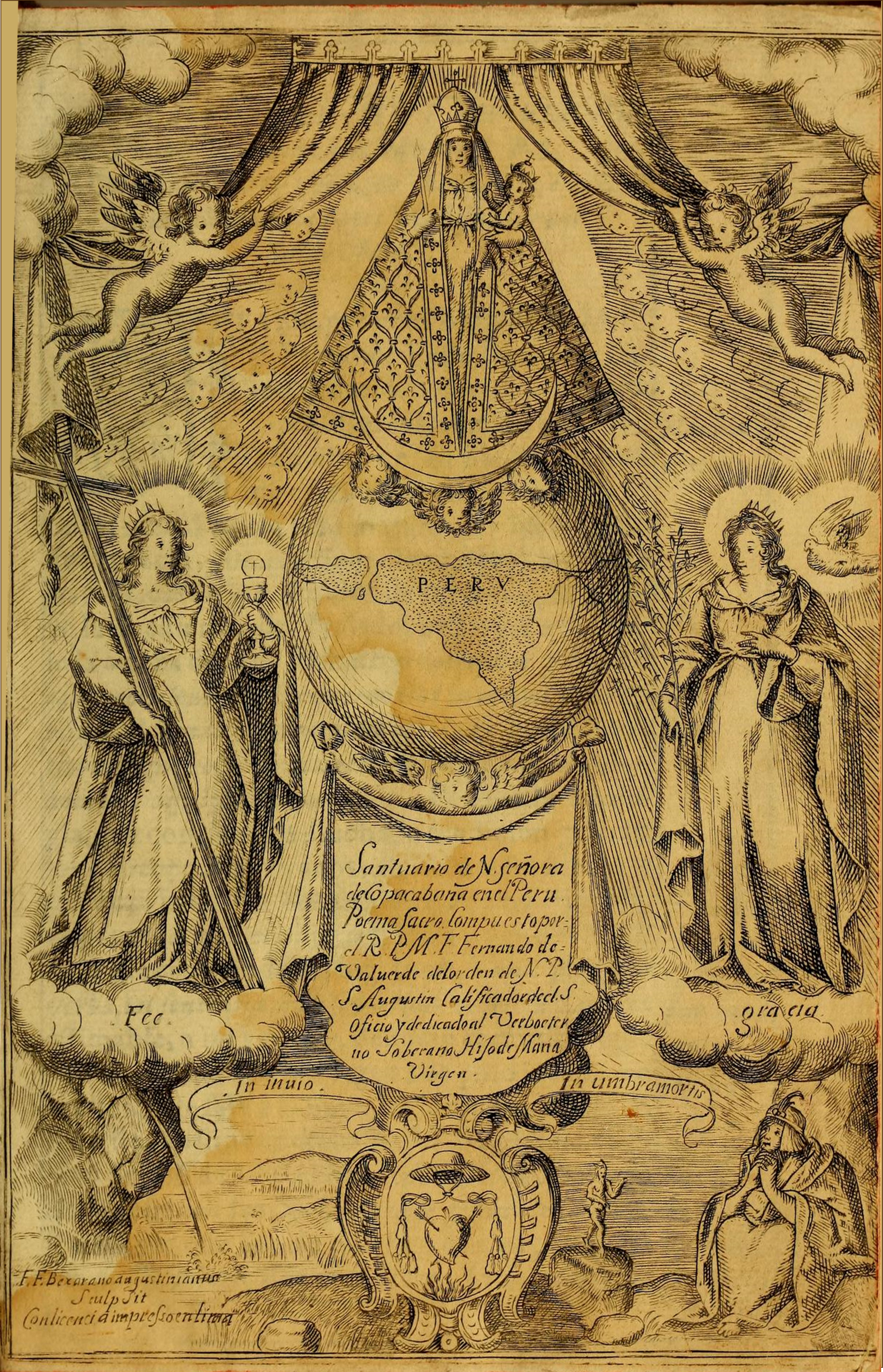
Cover of an Augustinian Poem dedicated to the Virgin, printed in Lima (1641)

]

The veneration of the Virgin of Copacabana was not limited to this region, but rapidly expanded to the whole Viceroyalty of Peru, and was even said to be the Patroness of the country. In Lima, the Viceroy of Peru decided to build a Church for the Virgin after an image of her survived the earthquake of 1687.

During the 17th and 18th century, this marian apparition was also venerated in Spain and Italy, where many paintings and literary books were made.

== Robbery (2013) ==
In the early hours of Monday 22 April 2013 the sanctuary of Copacabana was robbed and the image of the Virgen de Copacabana was stripped of her gold and silver accessories. Initial reports indicate that twenty-eight items, including the sculpture of the baby Jesus, were removed from the Virgen de Copacabana by thieves who entered the building using a ladder stolen from a nearby telecommunications station.

On Saturday 6 July 2013, the town of Copacabana restored the image of the Virgin with new jewelry.
