= Apostolic Vicariate of El Beni =

Catholic missionary jurisdiction in Bolivia

Apostolic Vicariate of El Beni Apostolicus Vicariatus Benensis Vicariato Apostólico de El Beni o Beni
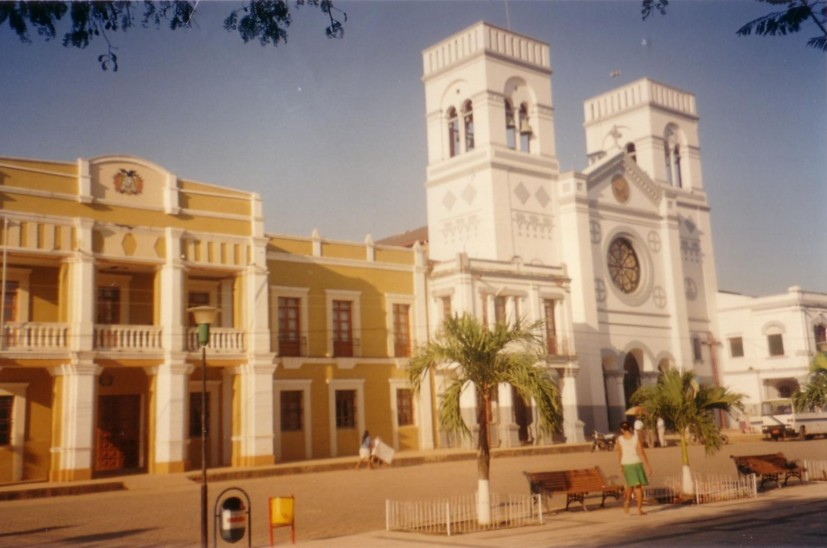
- Cathedral of the Most Holy Trinity

Location
- Country: Bolivia
- Ecclesiastical province: Immediately exempt to the Holy See

Statistics
- Area: 150,686 km^{2} (58,180 sq mi)
- Population: Total; Catholics: (as of 2010); 206,010; 164,808 (80%)
- Parishes: 30

Information
- Denomination: Catholic Church
- Sui iuris church: Latin Church
- Rite: Roman Rite
- Established: 1 December 1917 (108 years ago)
- Cathedral: Cathedral of the Holy Trinity in Trinidad
- Patron saint: Holy Trinity

Current leadership
- Pope: Leo XIV
- Vicar Apostolic: Aurelio Pesoa Ribera, O.F.M.
- Auxiliary Bishops: Roberto Bordi, O.F.M.
- Bishops emeritus: Julio María Elías Montoya, O.F.M.

Map

The Apostolic Vicariate of El Beni (or Beni for short) (Latin: Apostolicus Vicariatus Benensis) is a Latin Church missionary ecclesiastical territory or apostolic vicariate. As an exempt territory, it is not part of any ecclesiastical province. Its cathedra is in the Catedral de la Santísima Trinidad (devoted to the Holy Trinity), in the episcopal see of Trinidad in Bolivia's Amazonian interior.

== History ==
On 1 December 1917 Pope Benedict XV established as Apostolic Vicariate of El Beni on territory split off from the then Diocese of Santa Cruz de la Sierra (now an archdiocese).

It lost territory twice in 1942, when Pope Pius XII created the Apostolic Vicariate of Pando and Apostolic Vicariate of Reyes.

Exceptionally for a pre-diocesan jurisdiction, it was repeatedly (since 1781) given an auxiliary bishop, so as to be headed by two titular bishops.

== Ordinaries ==
So far, all members of the missionary Friars Minor (O.F.M.)

- Ramón Calvó y Martí, O.F.M., Titular Bishop of Catenna (13 August 1919 – † 5 March 1926)
- Pedro Francisco Luna Pachón, O.F.M., Titular Bishop of Titiopolis (10 July 1926 – 1953) Resigned
- Carlos Anasagasti Zulueta, O.F.M., Titular Bishop of Caltadria (29 June 1953 – 17 November 1986) Resigned
  - Auxiliary Bishop Manuel Eguiguren Galarraga, O.F.M., Titular Bishop of Salpi (1981.11.30 – 2007.06.06)
- Julio María Elías Montoya, O.F.M., Titular Bishop of Cuma (17 November 1986 – 22 February 2020) Retired
  - Auxiliary Bishop Francisco Focardi Mazzocchi, O.F.M., Titular Bishop of Cenculiana (2007.06.06 – 2009.07.15)
  - Auxiliary Bishop Roberto Bordi, O.F.M., Titular Bishop of Mutugenna (2010.11.06 – ...)
- Aurelio Pesoa Ribera, O.F.M. (2020.11.28 -

== See also ==
- List of Jesuit sites
- Roman Catholicism in Bolivia

== Sources and external links ==
- GigaCatholic, with incumbent biography links
