= Manuel Eguiguren Galarraga =

The Most Reverend Manuel Eguiguren Galarraga
- Vicariate Apostolic of El Beni
- See: Titular bishop of Salapia
- Appointed: March 13, 1954
- Term ended: June 6, 2007
- Predecessor: André Charles Collini
- Successor: Paolo Selvadagi

Orders
- Ordination: April 5, 1947
- Consecration: April 27, 1958 by Alfio Rapisarda

Personal details
- Born: 1 January 1930 Goyaz, Spain
- Died: 15 July 2012 (aged 82) El Beni
- Denomination: Roman Catholic Church

Styles of Manuel Eguiguren Galarraga
- Reference style: The Most Reverend
- Spoken style: Your Excellency
- Religious style: Monsignor
- Posthumous style: none

Manuel Eguiguren Galarraga (January 1, 1930 – July 15, 2012) was the Roman Catholic titular bishop of Salapia and auxiliary bishop of the Vicariate Apostolic of El Beni or Beni, Bolivia.

Ordained to the priesthood in 1954, Eguiguren Galarraga was named bishop in 1981 and retired in 2007.
