= Luis Antonio de Castro y Castillo =

Former Catholic Bishop

Most Reverend Luis Antonio de Castro y Castillo
- Bishop of La Paz
- Church: Catholic Church
- Diocese: Diocese of La Paz
- In office: 1647–1653
- Predecessor: Francisco de la Serna
- Successor: Martín Velasco y Molina

Personal details
- Born: Alcala la Real
- Died: 7 October 1653 La Paz, Bolivia

Luis Antonio de Castro y Castillo (died 1653) was a Roman Catholic prelate who served as Bishop of La Paz (1647–1653).

== Biography ==
Luis Antonio de Castro y Castillo was born in Alcala la Real. On 13 September 1647, he was selected as Bishop of La Paz and confirmed by Pope Innocent X on 13 January 1648. On 26 April 1648, he was consecrated bishop by Juan de Arguinao y Gutiérrez, Bishop of Santa Cruz de la Sierra. He served as Bishop of La Paz until his death on 7 October 1653.

== External links and additional sources ==
- Cheney, David M. "Archdiocese of La Paz". Catholic-Hierarchy.org. (for Chronology of Bishops) ^{[self-published]}
- Chow, Gabriel. "Metropolitan Archdiocese of La Paz (Bolivia)". GCatholic.org. (for Chronology of Bishops) ^{[self-published]}

Catholic Church titles
Preceded by Francisco de la Serna	Bishop of La Paz; 1647–1653	Succeeded by Martín Velasco y Molina
