= Archdiocese of La Paz =

Catholic ecclesiastical territory

Coordinates: 16.4963°S 68.1342°W

Archdiocese of La Paz Archidioecesis Pacensis in Bolivia Arquidiócesis de La Paz

Catholic
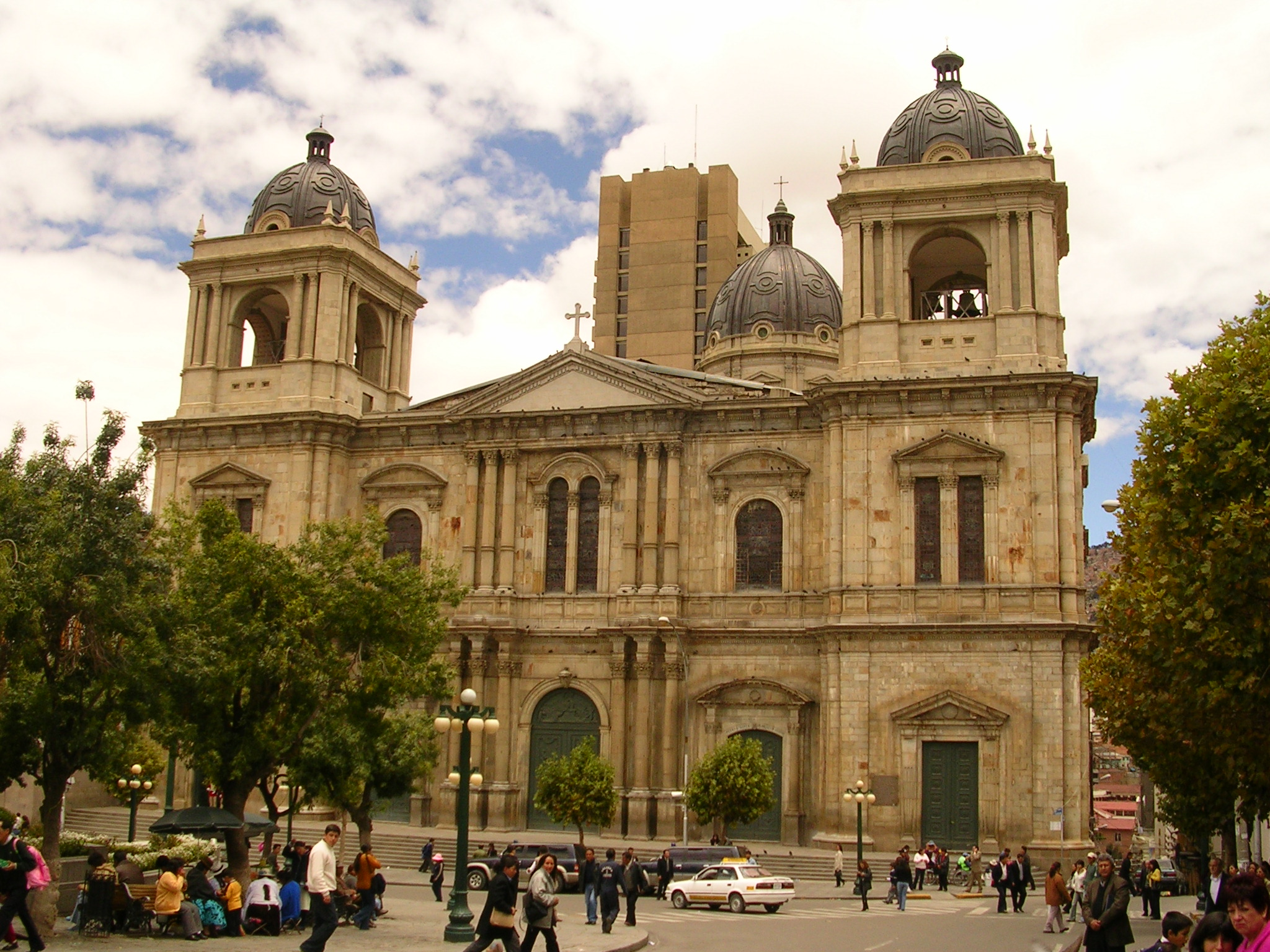
- Cathedral Basilica of Our Lady of Peace

Location
- Country: Bolivia
- Ecclesiastical province: La Paz

Statistics
- Area: 10,975 km^{2} (4,237 sq mi)
- Population: Total; Catholics: (as of 2004); 1,474,150; 1,292,873 (87.7%)
- Parishes: 53

Information
- Denomination: Catholic Church
- Rite: Roman Rite
- Established: 4 July 1605 (421 years ago)
- Cathedral: Catedral Basílica de Nuestra Señora de La Paz

Current leadership
- Pope: Leo XIV
- Metropolitan Archbishop: Percy Lorenzo Galván Flores
- Auxiliary Bishops: Mario Luis Durán Berríos, Pedro Luis Fuentes Valencia, Basilio Mamani Quispe
- Bishops emeritus: Edmundo Luis Flavio Abastoflor Montero

Map

Website
- www.arzobispadolapaz.org

The Roman Catholic Archdiocese of La Paz (Latin: Archidioecesis Pacensis in Bolivia) is an archdiocese located in the city of La Paz in Bolivia.

== History ==
- July 4, 1605: Established as Diocese of La Paz in Bolivia from the Diocese of La Plata
- June 18, 1943: Promoted as Metropolitan Archdiocese of La Paz

== Special churches ==
- Minor Basilicas:
  - Basílica de la Virgen de la Candelaria, Copacabana
  - Basílica de San Francisco, La Paz
  - Basílica María Auxiliadora, La Paz

== Bishops of the diocese ==
=== Diocese of La Paz ===
Erected: 4 July 1605

- Diego de Zambrana (de Carmona) (4 Jul 1605 – 14 Jan 1608 Appointed, Archbishop of La Plata o Charcas before he arrived in La Paz).
- Domingo Valderrama y Centeno, OP (28 May 1608 – 1615 Died)
- Pedro de Valencia (30 Jul 1617 – 1631 Died); Archbishop (personal title)
- Feliciano de la Vega Padilla (5 Sep 1633 – 13 Sep 1638 Appointed, Archbishop of México)
- Alfonso de Franco y Luna (30 May 1639 – 1645 Died)
- Francisco de la Serna, OESA (21 Aug 1645 – Apr 1647 Died)
- Luis Antonio de Castro y Castillo (13 Jan 1648 – 7 Oct 1653 Died)
- Martín Velasco y Molina (14 May 1655 – 1662 Died)
- Martín de Montalvo Calderon de la Barca, OSA (21 Jul 1664 – Dec 1668 Died)
- Gabriel de Guilléstegui, OFM (1 Sep 1670 – 1677 Died)
- Juan Pérez de Corcha (22 Jan 1680 Appointed – )
- Juan Queipo de Llano y Valdés (23 Sep 1680 – 19 Apr 1694 Appointed, Archbishop of La Plata o Charcas)
- Bernardo de Carrasco y Saavedra, OP (19 Jul 1694 – 24 Aug 1697 Died)
- Nicolás Urbán de Mota y Haro (12 May 1702 – 25 Dec 1704 Died)
- Diego Morcillo Rubio de Suñón de Robledo, OSsT (14 May 1708 – 21 Mar 1714 Appointed, Archbishop of La Plata o Charcas)
- Mateo Panduro y Villafaña, OCD (1 Oct 1714 – 21 Mar 1722 Died)
- Alejo Fernando de Rojas y Acevedo (30 Aug 1723 – 1730 Died)
- Agustín Rodríguez Delgado (17 Dec 1731 – 22 Jan 1742 Confirmed, Archbishop of La Plata o Charcas)
- Salvador Bermúdez y Becerra (28 Feb 1742 – 14 Jun 1746 Confirmed, Archbishop of La Plata o Charcas)
- José de Peralta Barrionuevo y Rocha Benavídez, OP (14 Jun 1746 – 17 Nov 1746 Died)
- Matías Ibáñez de Segovia (4 Sep 1747 – 25 Aug 1751 Died)
- Diego Antonio de Parada (18 Dec 1752 – 25 Jan 1762 Appointed, Archbishop of Lima)
- Gregorio Francisco de Campos (4 May 1764 – 22 Dec 1789 Died)
- Alejandro José de Ochoa y Morillo (11 Apr 1791 – 1796 Died)
- Remigio de La Santa y Ortega (24 Jul 1797 – 10 Aug 1816 Resigned)
- Antonio Sánchez Matas, OFM (21 Dec 1818 – 28 Apr 1827 Resigned)
- José María Mendizábal (15 Dec 1828 – 24 Jul 1835 Appointed, Archbishop of La Plata o Charcas)
- Francisco de Paula León de Aguirre Velasco (19 May 1837 – 13 Jul 1840 Resigned)
- José Manuel Fernández de Córdoba y Meló (13 Jul 1840 – 4 Mar 1841 Died)
- José Manuel Gregorio Indaburu (Yndaburu) (22 Jun 1843 – 16 Dec 1844 Died)
- Michael Orozco (20 Jan 1848 – 1849 Died)
- Mariano Fernández de Córdoba (10 Apr 1851 – 2 May 1868 Died)
- Calixto Maria Clavijo Salazar (24 Sep 1868 – 27 Apr 1874 Resigned)
- Juan de Dios Bosque (4 May 1874 – 9 March 1890 Died)
- Juan José Baldivia Morales (1 Jun 1891 – 5 Oct 1899 Died)
- Nicolás Armentia Ugarte, OFM (12 Nov 1901 – 24 Nov 1909 Died)
- Manuel José Peña (30 Nov 1911 – 10 Aug 1914 Died)
- Dionisio Avila (27 Jan 1916 – 30 Jun 1919 Died)
- Celestino Loza (20 Jun 1920 – 18 Jan 1921 Died)
- Auguste Sieffert, CSsR (15 Nov 1924 – 24 Feb 1934 Resigned)
- Abel Isidoro Antezana y Rojas, CMF (16 Jan 1938 – 5 Apr 1967 Retired)

=== Archdiocese of La Paz ===
Elevated: 18 June 1943

- Jorge Manrique Hurtado (27 Jul 1967 – 24 Feb 1987 Retired)
- Luis Sáinz Hinojosa, OFM (24 Feb 1987 – 31 Jul 1996 Resigned)
- Edmundo Luis Flavio Abastoflor Montero (31 Jul 1996 – 23 May 2020 Retired)
- Percy Lorenzo Galván Flores (23 May 2020 – present)

=== Coadjutor archbishop ===
- Alejandro Mestre Descals, SJ (1982.06.28 - 1987.02.24), did not succeed to see

=== Auxiliary Bishops of La Paz ===
- José Clemente Maurer CSsR, (1950.03.01 – 1951.10.27), appointed Archbishop of Sucre (Cardinal in 1967)
- Jorge Manrique Hurtado (1952.02.23 - 1956.07.28), appointed Bishop of Oruro (later returned here as Archbishop)
- José Armando Gutiérrez Granier (1956 - 1965.08.19), appointed Archbishop of Cochabamba
- Gennaro Maria Prata Vuolo, SDB (1960.12.09 - 1981.11.21), appointed Archbishop of Cochabamba
- Adhemar Esquivel Kohenque (1968.11.11 - 1992.11.10), appointed Coadjutor Bishop of Tarija
- Andrea Bernardo Schierhoff (1969.01.02 – 1982.12.17), appointed Prelate of Pando
- Julio Terrazas Sandoval, CSsR (1978.04.15 - 1982.01.09), appointed Bishop of Oruro; future Cardinal
- Gonzalo Ramiro del Castillo Crespo, OCD (1983.11.03 - 2000.04.14), appointed Bishop of Bolivia, Military
- Luis Morgan Casey (1983.12.03 – 1988.01.18), appointed Vicar Apostolic of Pando
- Nino Marzoli, CR (1988.04.16 - 1992.04.28), appointed Auxiliary Bishop of Santa Cruz de la Sierra
- Oscar Omar Aparicio Céspedes (2002.05.29 - 2012.04.04), appointed Bishop of Bolivia, Military
- Aurelio Pesoa Ribera, OFM (2014.03.25 - 2020.11.28), appointed Vicar Apostolic of El Beni
- Jorge Ángel Saldías Pedraza, OP (2014.03.25 - 2019.10.11), appointed Bishop of Tarija
- Mario Luis Durán Berríos (2022.02.22-)
- Pedro Luis Fuentes Valencia (2022.02.22-)
- Basilio Mamani Quispe (2022.02.22-)

== Suffragan dioceses ==
- Diocese of Coroico
- Diocese of El Alto
- Territorial Prelature of Corocoro

== See also ==
- Roman Catholicism in Bolivia
