= Domingo Valderrama y Centeno =

Catholic archbishop

Most Reverend Domingo Valderrama y Centeno
- Archbishop (personal title) of La Paz
- Church: Catholic Church
- Archdiocese: Diocese of La Paz
- In office: 1608–1615
- Predecessor: Diego de Zambrana
- Successor: Pedro de Valencia
- Previous post: Archbishop of Santo Domingo (1606–1608).

Orders
- Consecration: 1607

Personal details
- Died: 1615 La Paz, Bolivia

Domingo Valderrama y Centeno (died 1615) was a Roman Catholic prelate who served as Archbishop of La Paz (1608–1615) and Archbishop of Santo Domingo (1606–1608).

== Biography ==
Domingo Valderrama y Centeno was ordained a priest in the Order of Preachers. On 25 September 1606, he was selected by the King of Spain and confirmed by Pope Paul V as Archbishop of Santo Domingo. In 1607, he was consecrated bishop. On 28 May 1608, he was appointed by Pope Paul V as Archbishop (personal title) of La Paz where he served until his death in 1615.

== External links and additional sources ==
- Cheney, David M. "Archdiocese of Santo Domingo". Catholic-Hierarchy.org. (for Chronology of Bishops) ^{[self-published]}
- Chow, Gabriel. "Metropolitan Archdiocese of Santo Domingo". GCatholic.org. (for Chronology of Bishops) ^{[self-published]}
- Cheney, David M. "Archdiocese of La Paz". Catholic-Hierarchy.org. (for Chronology of Bishops) ^{[self-published]}
- Chow, Gabriel. "Metropolitan Archdiocese of La Paz (Bolivia)". GCatholic.org. (for Chronology of Bishops) ^{[self-published]}

Catholic Church titles
Preceded by Agustín Dávila Padilla	Archbishop of Santo Domingo; 1606–1608	Succeeded by Cristóbal Rodríguez Juárez
Preceded by Diego de Zambrana	Archbishop (personal title) of La Paz; 1608–1615	Succeeded by Pedro de Valencia
