= Gonzalo Hernandez y Hermosillo y Gonzalez =

Mexican Catholic prelate (1560–1631)

Most Reverend Gonzalo Hernandez y Hermosillo y Gonzalez
- Bishop of Durango
- Church: Catholic Church
- Diocese: Diocese of Durango
- In office: 1620–1631
- Predecessor: None
- Successor: Alfonso de Franco y Luna

Orders
- Consecration: 30 November 1621 by Juan Pérez de la Serna

Personal details
- Born: 1560 Mexico
- Died: 28 January 1631 (aged 70–71) Durango, Mexico

Gonzalo Hernandez y Hermosillo y Gonzalez, O.S.A. (1560 – 28 January, 1631) was a Roman Catholic prelate who served as the first Bishop of Durango (1620–1631).

== Biography ==
Gonzalo Hernandez y Hermosillo y Gonzalez was born in Mexico in 1560 and ordained a priest in the Order of Saint Augustine. On 12 October 1620, he was appointed during the papacy of Pope Paul V as Bishop of Durango. On 30 November 1621, he was consecrated bishop by Juan Pérez de la Serna, Archbishop of Mexico. He served as Bishop of Durango until his death on 28 January 1631.

== External links and additional sources ==
- Cheney, David M. "Archdiocese of Durango". Catholic-Hierarchy.org. (for Chronology of Bishops) ^{[self-published]}
- Chow, Gabriel. "Archdiocese of Durango (Mexico)". GCatholic.org. (for Chronology of Bishops) ^{[self-published]}

Catholic Church titles
Preceded by None	Bishop of Durango; 1620–1631	Succeeded by Alfonso de Franco y Luna
