= Virgin of Urkupiña =

Catholic title in Bolivia

Virgen Urkupiña Virgen María de Urkupiña
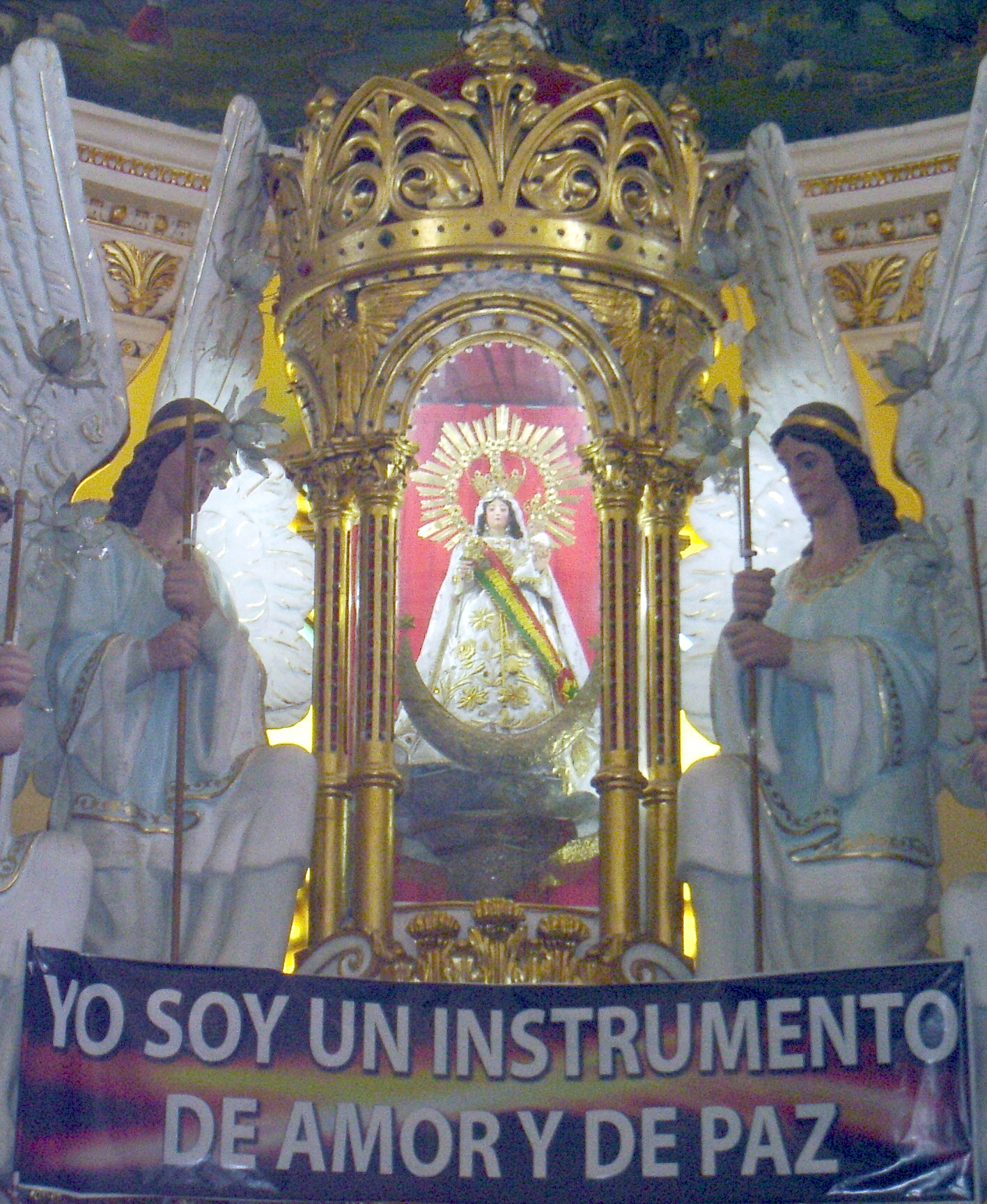
- Image of the Virgin Mary of Urkupiña
- Venerated in: Catholic Church
- Shrine: San Ildefonso de Quillacollo
- Patronage: National integration of Bolivia
- Feast day: August 15

The Virgin of Urkupiña, also known as the Virgin of Urcupiña or the Virgin of Urqupiña, is a Roman Catholic title given to an image of the Madonna and Child. She is venerated on August 15 in the city of Quillacollo, a provincial capital located 14 km from the city of Cochabamba in Bolivia. Her feast day coincides with the Feast of the Assumption of Mary, when Mary, already elderly, was taken to heaven. For this reason, the Virgin of Urkupiña is sometimes called "Asunta."

== Story ==
According to popular tradition, in the late 17th century, southwest of Quillacollo, there lived a peasant family who made a living thanks to the usefulness of their small flock of sheep, which was tended by their youngest daughter. Every day, the girl would go to the low hills opposite Cota, crossing the Sapinku River, where there was plenty of pasture for her flock. One day in August, a lady appeared to her carrying a child, and the girl and the lady had long conversations in the local language, Quechua. The shepherdess played with the child in the waters of a spring that flowed from the rocks.

From then on, the girl was almost always late returning to her parents' hut. When they asked her why, the girl recounted her encounters with the woman she called "the little mother and the child." She said they would go down to play with her at the chimpa juturis (or chimpa pilas), which was and still is the name of the two springs of clear, sweet water located at the foot of the hill. Upon hearing this, her parents became alarmed and went repeatedly to the green hill to verify the incredible stories.

When the "Little Mother" visited again, the girl went to find her parents, who in turn sought out the parish priest (parishes were called "doctrines," and by extension, the priest was also called a "doctrinero") and neighbors from the small village. Having heard of the event, the neighbors decided to verify its truth by going to the place the girl had indicated. When the Virgin saw that the shepherdess hadn't appeared, she got up from where she was and climbed the hill, while the girl shouted, pointing, in Quechua, "Jaqaypiña urqupiña, urkupiña," which in Spanish means "she is already on the hill" (urqu = hill, piña = already there), hence the Spanish name. When they reached the top, the lady disappeared, but they managed to see a celestial image that vanished into the tangle of carob trees, cacti, and ulula trees. Convinced that the vision was strange, they ran back to the village. The parish priest summoned the villagers, and together with other authorities, they went to the site of the miracle, across from the Cota ranch. An image of the Virgin and child was found there. The boisterous crowd carried the image to the chapel in Quillacollo, and since then it has been known as the Virgin of Urkupiña, who is greatly venerated by the Bolivian people. The accounts of the miracles bestowed upon her devotees are extraordinary. A chapel dedicated to the Virgin was built on that site, which was later moved to the main church in Quillacollo. Pilgrims from all over Bolivia and South America come to venerate the patron saint of National Integration. (This account was written by Monsignor Francisco Cano Galvarro and Mercedes Anaya de Urquidi.)

== History and documentation ==
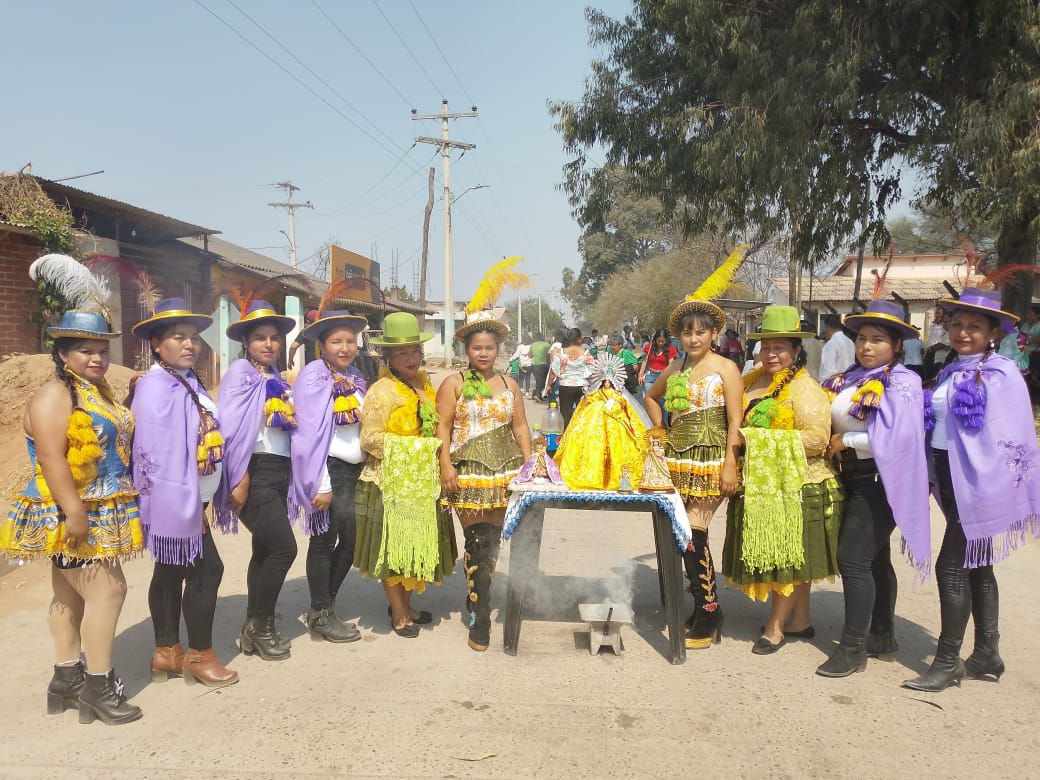
Women dancing in honor of the Virgen de Urkupiña, in the Yaguacua community, in the provincia del Gran Chaco, Bolivia (2024).

Although there is no data regarding the exact date of the official recognition of the Virgin of Urkupiña as an authentic Marian image, according to some sources the cult of the image dates back to the time of the viceroyalty (16th century). In the 1980s, a great impact came from the publication of articles in a book, under the direction of journalist Rafael Peredo Antezana, entitled The Miracle of Urkupiña (1979). These articles compile valuable information from many years of history. One of these stories notes that that more than ten thousand pilgrims from Santa Cruz traveled to Urkupiña.

== The Temple of San Ildefonso ==
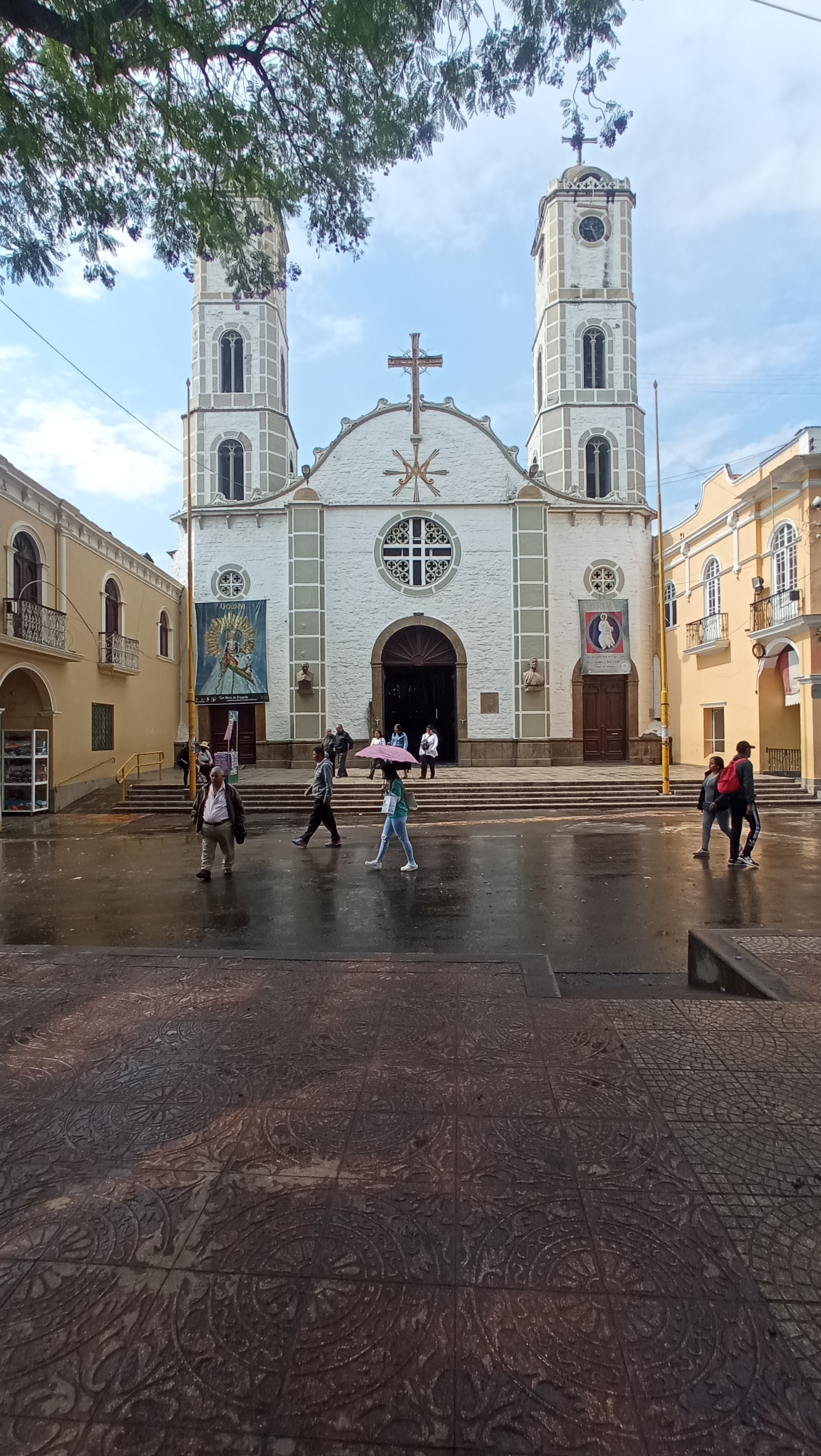
Front view of the temple of "San Idelfonso", in the urban center of the municipality.

One of the most important historic monuments in Quillacollo is the Church of San Ildefonso, whose construction started long after the miraculous events involving the apparition of the Virgin. The temple's first stone was laid in 1908, with Rev. Father Fructuoso Mencia being the pastor, and it was concluded in 1947 under Monsignor Francisco Cano Galvarro. On its altar can be found, enthroned, the Patroness of National Integration, the Virgin Mary of Urkupiña.

== The Feast ==
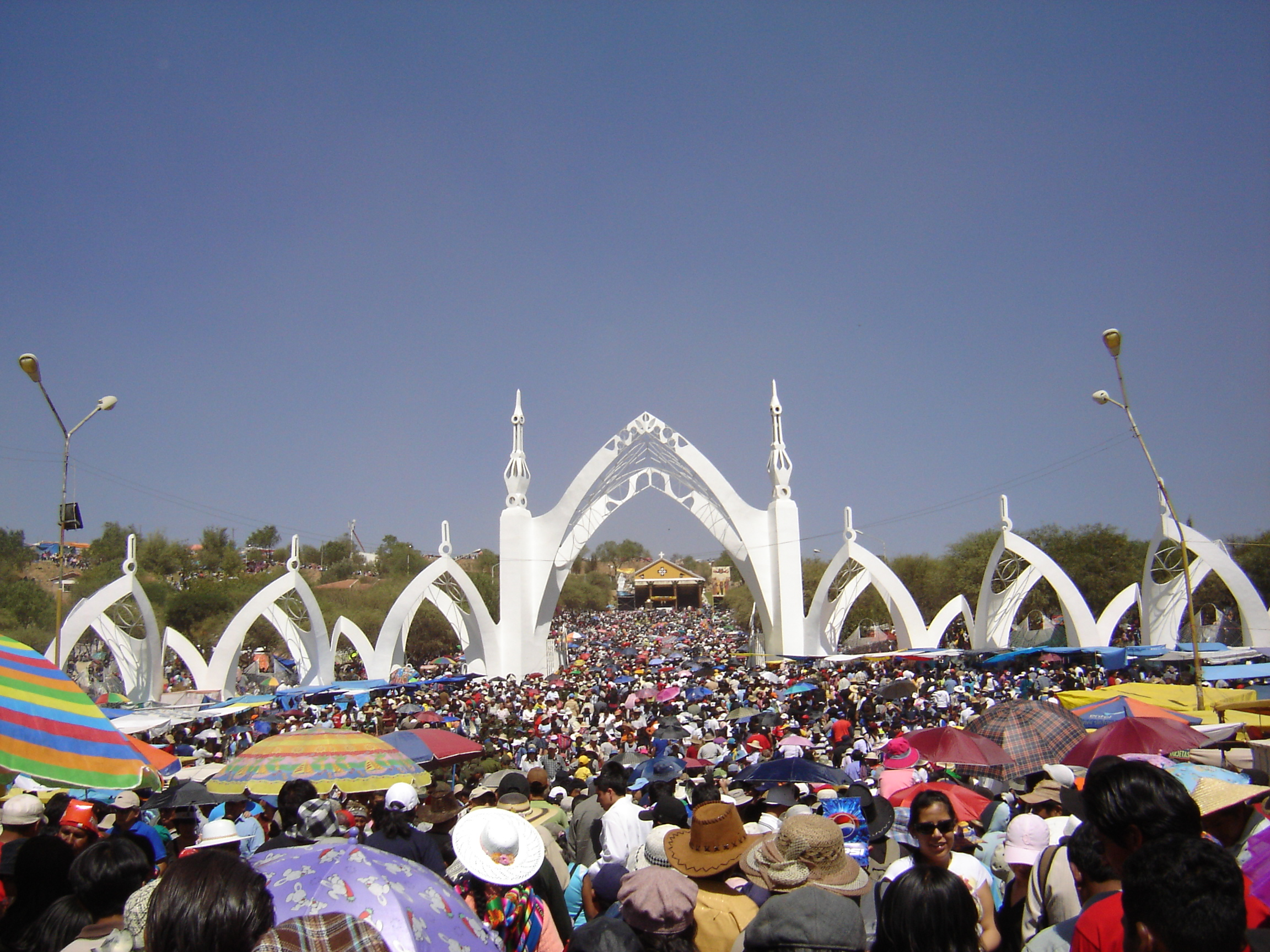
The massive pilgrimage of the devout to the Calvary of the Virgen María de Urqupiña, in Cerro Cota, the place of her apparition.

Today, the festival in honor of the Virgin of Urkupiña is made up of a series of events that mark life in Quillacollo during July and August. It begins with the Fastuosa Entrada Folclórica (the "Magnificent Folk Entrance Parade") on August 14, a procession of about fifteen thousand costumed dancers accompanied by musicians. This event is inspired by the Carnaval de Oruro. During the second half of the twentieth century, the event has managed to concentrate and standardize the multitude of Bolivian folkloric expressions. Nowadays, it serves as the highest expression of Bolivia's complex of folkloric-religious traditions, at once national and urban in nature. The event is renowned for its color and majesty, for the participation of thousands of worshipers, and for the diverse music and dances that adorn it. On August 15, the solemn feast day mass is celebrated, with the attendance of the ecclesiastical, national and departmental authorities of Bolivia. That day ends with the procession of the image of the Virgin of Urkupiña through some of the streets of the center of the city of Quillacollo and the repetition of the Folk Entrance Parade. The festival concludes on the 16th with a popular pilgrimage to Cota Hill (Calvario), where, according to tradition, the Virgin appeared. At Calvary, a series of rituals are performed, such as the removal of pieces of stone as a symbolic loan of spiritual and material goods, with the promise to return the following year to repay the corresponding interest. There is also the symbolic purchase of small plots of land and other miniature objects (houses, vehicles, professional degrees, etc.), with the hope of acquiring a real one by next year. In both cases, the ch'alla(libation and offering to Pachamama) is performed, asking for blessings and favors from the Virgin of Urkupiña.

The festival typically attracts a very large number of parishioners and national and international tourists. Approximately four hundred thousand came in 2008. The festival is an important milestone in religious and social life as well as in the economy, folklore and tourism in Bolivia and South America.

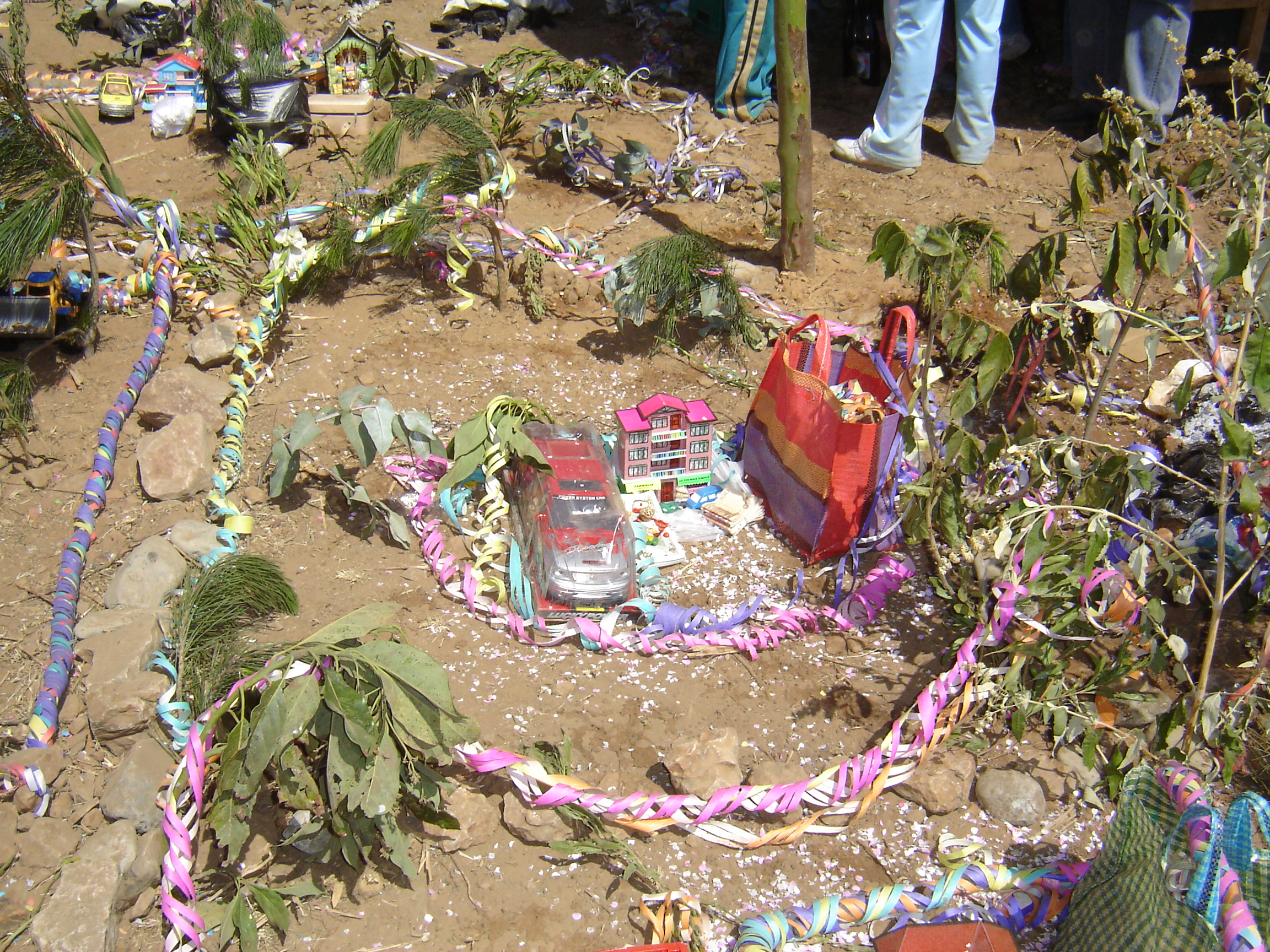
Ch'alla of plots of land and other objects in the Calvary of the Virgin Mary of Urqupiña.

== Proposal related to cultural and material patrimony ==
For several years, consideration has been given to the idea of proposing the Festival of the Virgin of Urkupiña as Intangible Cultural Heritage by UNESCO. This proposal began to be promoted in 2019, based on the festival's cultural and religious syncretism, with prehispanic ancestral practices living alongside Christian religious practices.

== Devotion in other countries ==
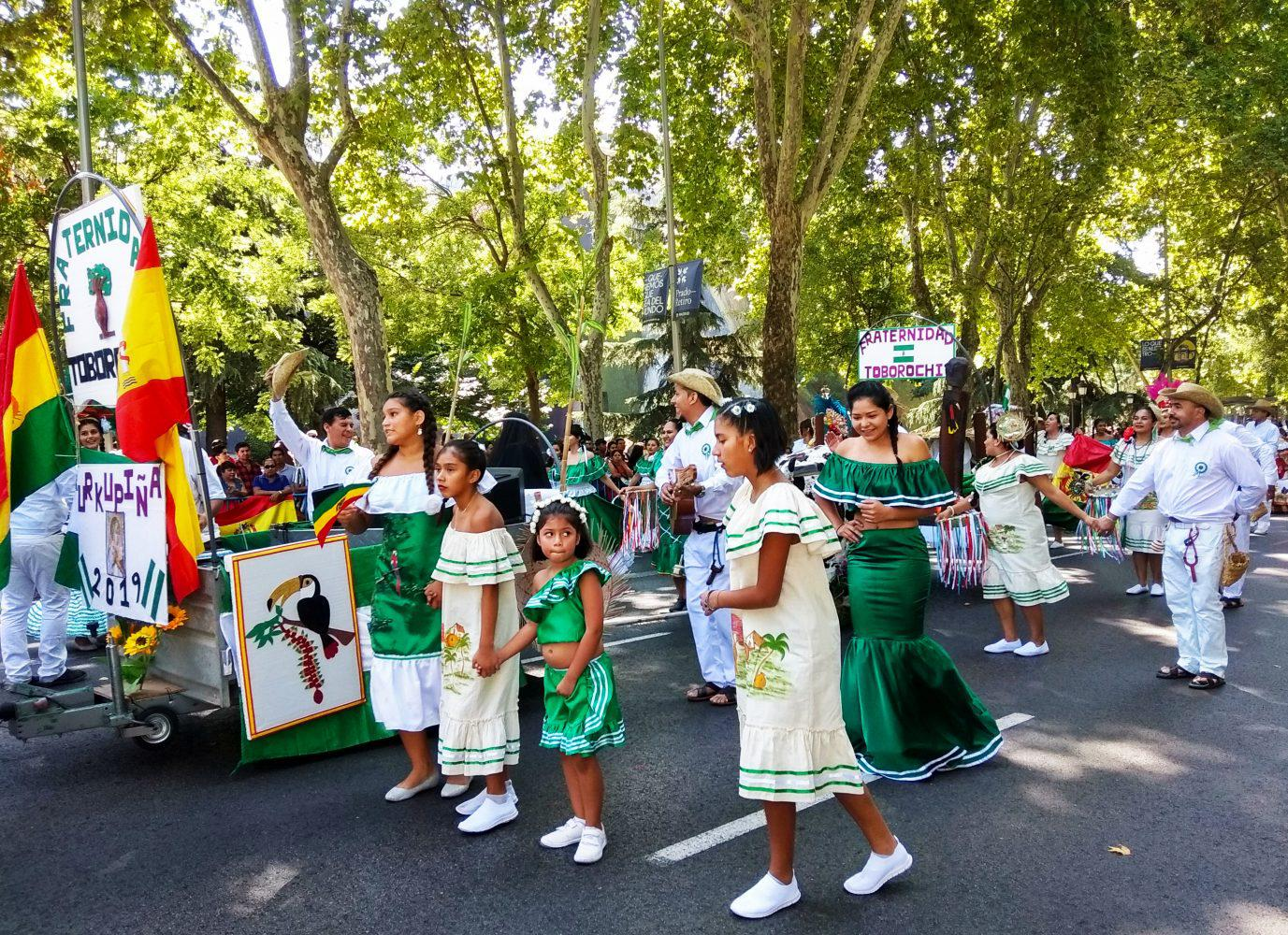
Celebration of the Virgin of Urkupiña in the Bolivian community in Madrid.

Bolivians in other countries often establish devotions to the Virgin of Urkupiña, as Tobias Reu has noted. Some examples include the following:

- The «Villa El Libertador» neighborhood, Córdoba, Argentina. The festival has been celebrated since 1982.
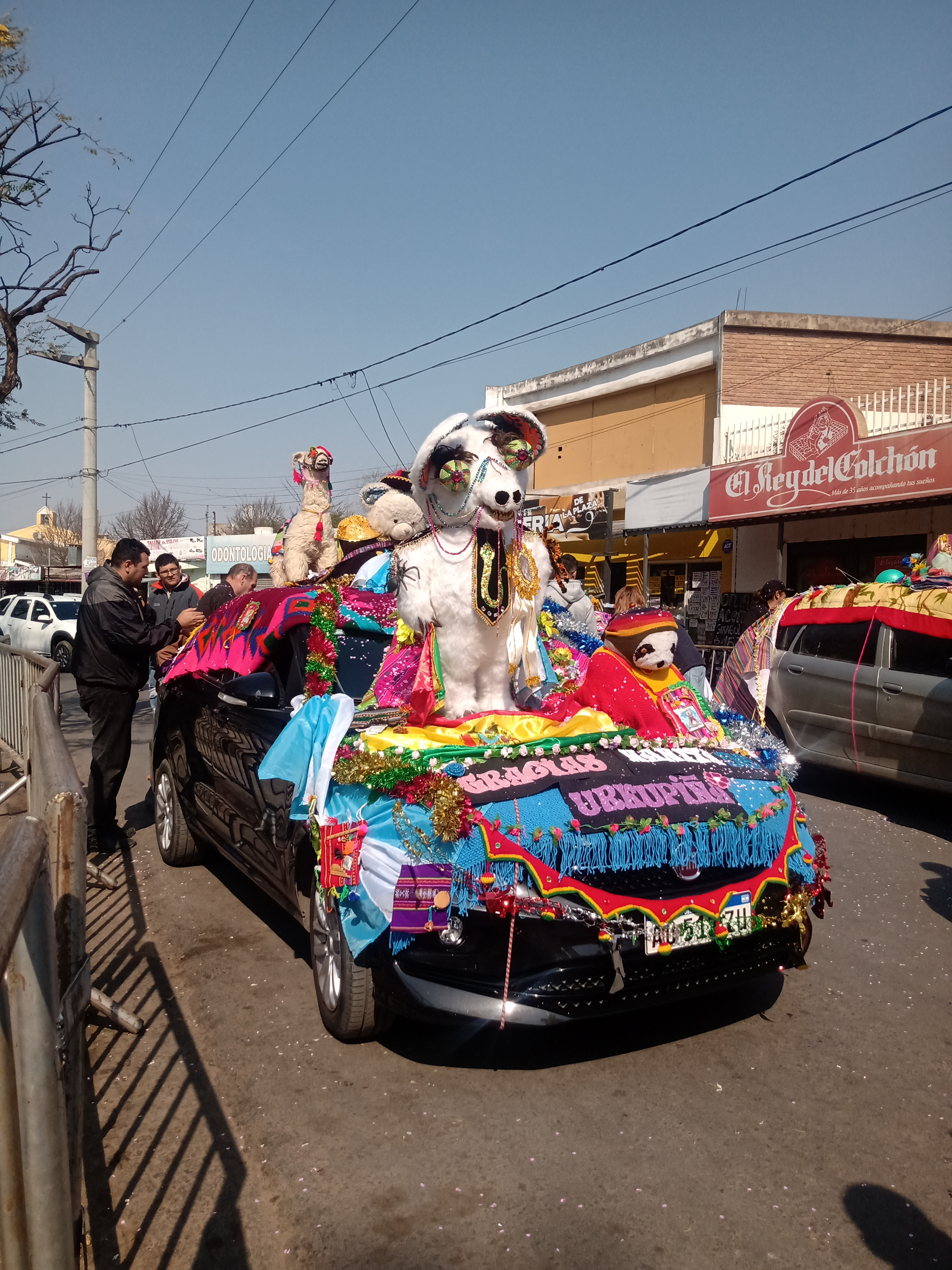
  Cars with offerings for the Virgin of Urkupiña in Villa el Libertador, Córdoba, Argentina.
- In the city of Río Gallegos Argentina, the festival has been celebrated since 2009.
- A festival for the Virgin is celebrated in Bahia Blanca, Argentina
- In the city of Madrid, Spain, the Virgin has been honored through a festival.
- A celebration of the Virgin took place in Sydney, Australia

== See also ==
- Virgen La Bella
- Virgen de Copacabana
- Virgen de Cotoca
- Virgen de Chaguaya
- Virgen del Socavón
- Virgen del Carmen

== Bibliography ==
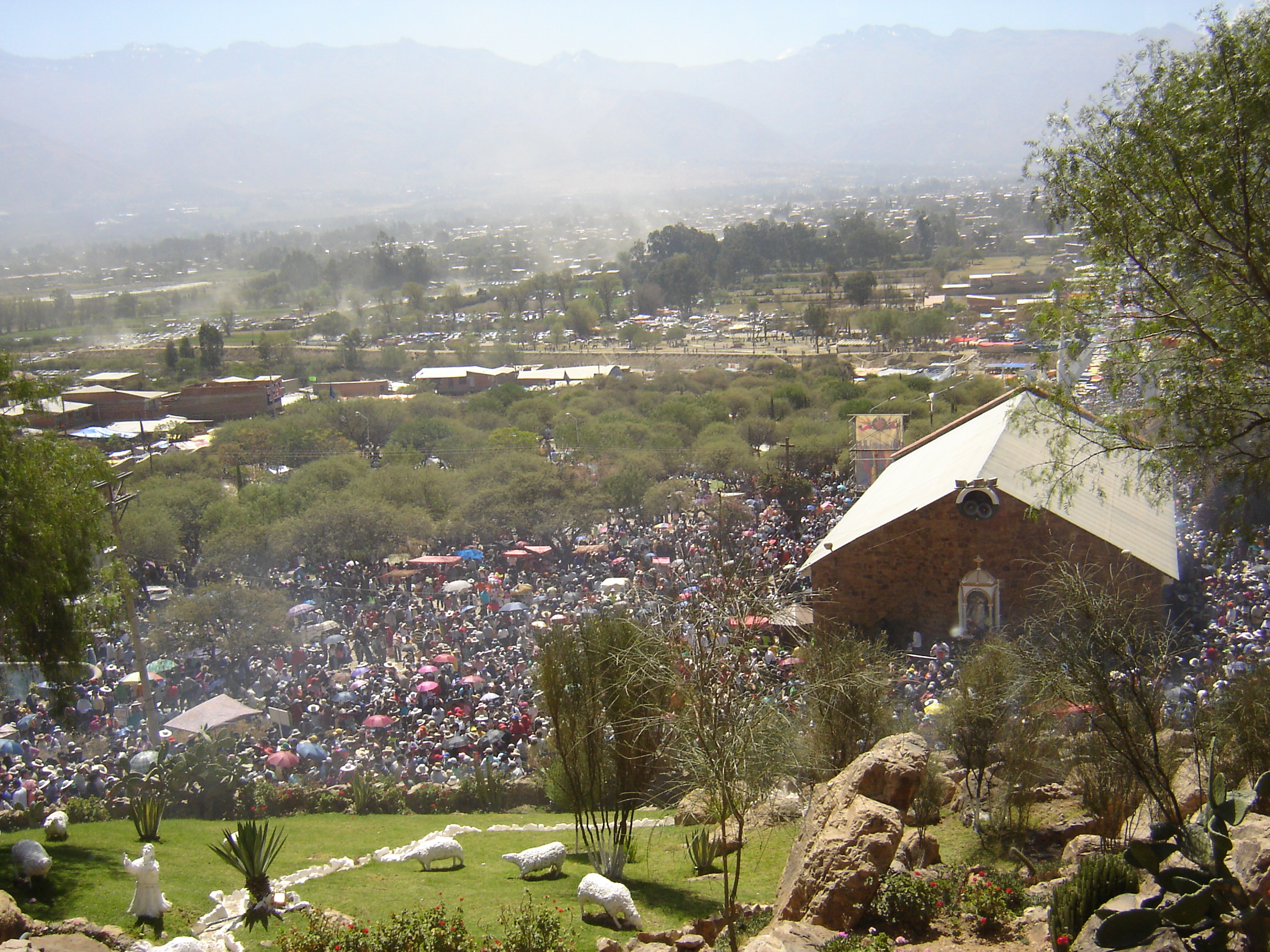
Pligrims on Cerro Quta.

- García Vázquez, Cristina. 2005. Los migrantes. Otros entre nosotros. Etnografía de la población boliviana en la provincia de Mendoza, Argentina, Mendoza, EDIUNC.
- Giorgis, Martha, La virgen prestamista: la fiesta de la Virgen de Urkupiña en el boliviano Gran Córdoba, Buenos Aires 2004.
- González, Walter y García, Mérida Wilson, Historia del milagro. Antología de Urqupiña, Cochabamba 2001.
- Glatre, Gwénaël, Orqopiña, Fête et Archéologie de l'Imaginaire en Bolivie, Tesina de Posgrado en Historia, Universidad Rennes II Haute-Bretagne, Rennes, Francia, 2007.
- Glatre, Gwénaël, ¡Orqopiña! La fiesta qhochala entre la sangre y los angeles. Una arqueologia del nuevo imaginario boliviano. Museo Nacional de Etnografia e Folklore—MUSEF XXI Reunion Annual de Etnologia, La Paz, August 2007. link
- Lagos, María L., “We Have to Learn to Ask”: Hegemony, Diverse Experiences, and Antagonistic Meanings in Bolivia, American Ethnologist 20(1):52–71, 1993.
- Peredo, Rafael, El milagro de Urkupiña, Cochabamba 1979
- Ramos Félix Alfredo, Urqupiña: una luz de esperanza, Cochabamba 2009.
- Taboada Terán, Néstor, ed., Urqupiña por siempre, Cochabamba 1999.
- Villarroel Triveño Arturo, Urqupiña: Folklore y cultura, Cochabamba 1985.
