= Francisco Tito Yupanqui =

Bolivian sculptor

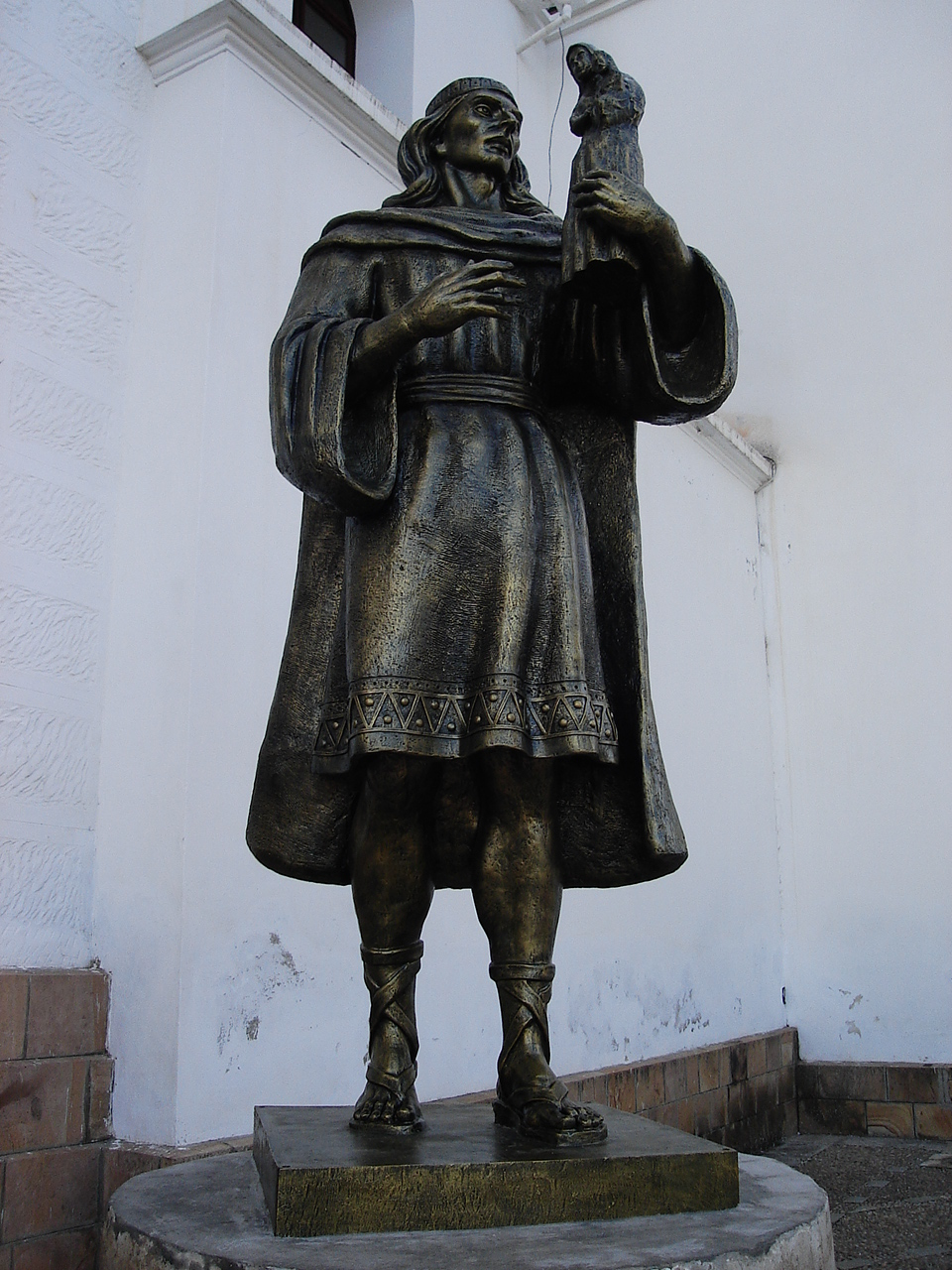
- Statue of Tito Yupanqui in Copacabana
- Born: 1550; Copacabana
- Died: 1616 (65-66); Cusco, Real Audiencia de Charcas
- Occupation: Sculptor
- Known for: Sculpture, wood-carving, Marian images
- Notable work: Virgen de Copacabana (1583)

Francisco Tito Yupanqui (1550–1616) was an indigenous sculptor of the Viceroyalty of Peru. He sculptured renowned Roman Catholic wood statues such as the Blessed Virgin Mary in what is now Bolivia, known as Our Lady of Candles (also known as Our Lady of Copacabana), one of the most celebrated Marian images located at Lake Titicaca in Bolivia.

== Background ==
Yupanqui was born in Copacabana of Tola and Francisco Tito Yupanqui Sr. His family was Anansayas, or descendants of Quechua people who relocated to Copacabana with the Inca. He came from a family recently converted to Roman Catholicism by the Dominican priests but like many of the time, retained some of the Aymara religious beliefs.

== Our Lady of Copacabana ==
Under the influence of the Dominicans, Yupanqui's monotheistic beliefs increased while studying religion, and he started admiring the works of European religious art. Legend has it that one night, a beautiful woman carrying in her arms a child appeared in the fourth month of the Indian calendar and was charged with the task of making the image. This image later became known as Nuestra Senora de Virgen de la Candelaria or Our Virgin Lady of the Candles. Father Antonio Montoro, who was the presiding parish priest at the time insisted that the image of the virgin be likened to European faces, but Yupanqui insisted that the face of the statue be likened to the native people of Bolivia.

== Later art career ==
Later in his life, Yupanqui created three other replicas of his famed Marian image and sent them to three different places. One statue resides in Cocharcas, Peru while another is located in Pucarani, Bolivia and yet another one was sent to Tucumán in northern Argentina. The sculpture Our Lady of Cocharcas is attributed to him.

== Veneration ==
Yupanqui died in 1616 in the monastery of Oblates of the Order of Saint Augustine in Cusco, Bolivia.

The statue Yupanqui made was crowned Queen of Bolivia on August 1, 1925 by the Republic of Bolivia, as accorded with national honors by the centenary of the country, with the participation of President Bautista Saavedra, officiating Archbishop Augusto Sieffert in a solemn High Mass and religious ceremony, along with Monsignor Gaetano Cicognani, the Apostolic Nuncio to Bolivia sent by Pope Pius XI.

In 2011, the Roman Catholic Bishops' Conference of Bolivia petitioned the Holy See to beatify Yupanqui as the first person of Bolivia.
