= Archdiocese of Popayán =

Catholic archdiocese in Colombia

Coordinates: 2.4411°N 76.6065°W

Archdiocese of Popayán Archidioecesis Popayanensis

Catholic

Location
- Country: Colombia
- Ecclesiastical province: Popayán

Statistics
- Area: 17,087 km^{2} (6,597 sq mi)
- Population: Total; Catholics: (as of 2004); 1,160,071; 1,100,000 (94.8%)

Information
- Rite: Latin Rite
- Established: 22 August 1546 (480 years ago)
- Cathedral: Catedral Basílica de Nuestra Señora de la Asunción

Current leadership
- Pope: Leo XIV
- Archbishop: Omar Alberto Sánchez Cubillos, O.P.
- Bishops emeritus: Iván Antonio Marín López

Map

Website
- arquidiocesisdepopayan.org

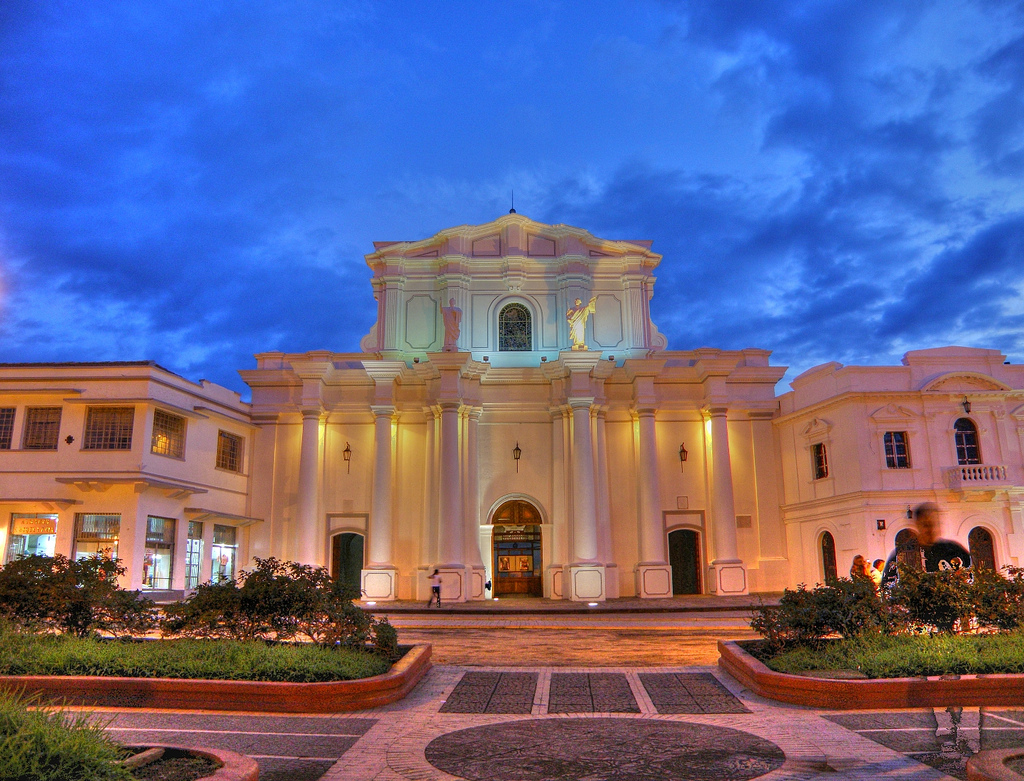
Cathedral Basilica of Our Lady of the Assumption

The Roman Catholic Archdiocese of Popayán (Latin: Popayanensis) is an archdiocese located in the city of Popayán in Colombia.

== History ==
- 22 August 1546: Established as Diocese of Popayán from the Diocese of Panamá
- 20 June 1900: Promoted as Metropolitan Archdiocese of Popayán

== Ordinaries ==
=== Bishops of Popayán ===
1. Juan Valle (27 August 1547 – 1563)
2. Agustín Gormaz Velasco, OSA (1 March 1564 – 1590)
3. Domingo de Ulloa, OP (9 December 1591 – 3 April 1598), appointed Bishop of Michoacán, México
4. Juan de La Roca (5 July 1599 – 7 September 1605)
5. Juan Pedro González de Mendoza, OSA (17 November 1608 – 14 February 1618)
6. Ambrosio Vallejo Mejia, O. Carm. (2 December 1619 – 27 January 1631), appointed Bishop of Trujillo, Peru
7. Feliciano de la Vega Padilla (10 February 1631 – 5 September 1633), appointed Bishop of La Paz, Bolivia
8. Diego Montoya Mendoza (5 September 1633 – 5 October 1637, appointed Bishop of Trujillo, Peru
9. Francisco de la Serna, OSA (25 August 1637 – 21 August 1645), appointed Bishop of La Paz, Bolivia
10. Vasco Jacinto de Contreras y Valverde (25 February 1658 – 7 June 1666), appointed Bishop of Ayacucho o Huamanga (Guamanga), Peru
11. Melchor Liñán y Cisneros (16 January 1668 – 8 February 1672), appointed Archbishop of La Plata o Charcas, Bolivia
12. Cristóbal Bernardo de Quirós (16 May 1672 – 11 May 1684)
13. Pedro Díaz de Cienfuegos (12 August 1686 – 20 February 1696), appointed Bishop of Trujillo, Peru
14. Mateo Panduro y Villafaña, OCD (18 June 1696 – 1 October 1714), appointed Bishop of La Paz, Bolivia
15. Juan Gómez de Neva y Frías (19 November 1714 – 19 November 1725), appointed Bishop of Quito, Ecuador
16. Juan Francisco Gómez Calleja (19 November 1725 – 9 September 1728)
17. Manuel Antonio Gómez de Silva (20 September 1728 – 29 September 1731)
18. Diego Fermín de Vergara, OSA (19 December 1732 – 12 December 1740), appointed Archbishop of Santafé en Nueva Granada
19. Francisco José de Figueredo y Victoria (30 January 1741 – 24 January 1752), appointed Archbishop of Guatemala
20. Diego del Corro (24 January 1752 – 13 March 1758), appointed Archbishop of Lima, Peru
21. Jerónimo de Obregón y Mena (13 March 1758 – 14 July 1785)
22. Angel Velarde y Bustamante (15 September 1788 – 6 July 1809)
23. Salvador Jiménez y Padilla (8 March 1816 – 13 February 1841)
24. Fernando Cuero y Caicedo, OFM (23 May 1842 – 7 August 1851)
25. Pedro Antonio Torres (20 December 1853 – 18 December 1866)
26. Carlos Bermúdez (13 March 1868 – 6 December 1887)
27. Juan Buenaventura Ortiz (1 June 1888 – 15 August 1894)
28. Manuel José Caicedo Martínez (2 December 1895 – 20 June 1900)

=== Archbishops of Popayán ===
1. Manuel José Caicedo Martínez (20 June 1900 – 14 December 1905), appointed Archbishop of Medellín
2. Manuel Antonio Arboleda y Scarpetta, CM (18 April 1907 – 31 March 1923)
3. Maximiliano Crespo Rivera (15 November 1923 – 7 November 1940)
4. Juan Manuel González Arbeláez (20 June 1942 – 1 February 1944)
5. Diego María Gómez Tamayo (22 April 1944 – 12 September 1964)
6. Miguel Angel Arce Vivas (7 April 1965 – 11 October 1976)
7. Samuel Silverio Buitrago Trujillo, CM (11 October 1976 – 11 April 1990)
8. Alberto Giraldo Jaramillo, PSS (18 December 1990 – 13 February 1997), appointed Archbishop of Medellín
9. Iván Antonio Marín López (19 April 1997 – 19 May 2018)
10. Luis José Rueda Aparicio (19 May 2018 – 25 April 2020), appointed Archbishop of Bogotá
11. Omar Alberto Sánchez Cubillos, O.P. (12 October 2020 – present)

== Other affiliated bishops ==
=== Auxiliary bishops ===
- Antonio Burbano, O.E.S.A. (1837)
- Mateo José González Rubio (1839-1845)
- José Elías Puyana (1849-1859), appointed Bishop of Pasto
- Raúl Zambrano Camader (1956-1962), appointed Bishop of Facatativá
- Alfonso Arteaga Yepes (1962-1965), appointed Bishop of Ipiales
- Hernando Velásquez Lotero (1971-1973), appointed Bishop of Facatativá
- Alberto Giraldo Jaramillo, P.S.S. (1974-1977), appointed Bishop of Chiquinquirá (later returned here as Archbishop)

=== Another priest of this diocese who became bishop ===
- Heladio Posidio Perlaza Ramírez, appointed Bishop of Cali in 1911

== Suffragan dioceses ==
- Ipiales
- Pasto
- Tumaco

== See also ==
- Roman Catholicism in Colombia
