= Apostolic Vicariate of Pando =

Catholic missionary jurisdiction in Bolivia

Apostolic Vicariate of Pando Apostolicus Vicariatus Pandoënsis Vicariato Apostólico de Pando

Location
- Country: Bolivia
- Ecclesiastical province: Immediately exempt to the Holy See

Statistics
- Area: 86,261 km^{2} (33,306 sq mi)
- Population: Total; Catholics: (as of 2010); 208,867; 187,981 (90%)
- Parishes: 6

Information
- Denomination: Roman Catholic
- Rite: Roman Rite
- Established: 29 April 1942 (82 years ago)
- Cathedral: Cathedral of Our Lady of Mount Carmel in Riberalta

Current leadership
- Pope: Francis
- Apostolic Vicar: Eugenio Coter

Map

The Vicariate Apostolic of Pando (Latin: Apostolicus Vicariatus Pandoënsis) is a Latin Church missionary ecclesiastical territory or apostolic vicariate of the Catholic Church in Bolivia. Its cathedra is located in the episcopal see of Riberalta.

== History ==
- April 29, 1942: Established as Vicariate Apostolic of Pando from the Apostolic Vicariate of El Beni

== Apostolic Vicars ==
- Bishop Alfonso Manuel Escalante y Escalante, M.M. † (1943.01.13 – 1960.11.15)
- Bishop Thomas Patrick Collins, M.M. † (1960.11.15 – 1968.11)
- Bishop Andrea Bernardo Schierhoff † (1982.12.17 – 1986.12.01)
- Bishop Luis Morgan Casey † (1988.01.18 – 2013.02.02)
- Bishop Eugenio Coter (2013.02.02 – present)

== See also ==
- Roman Catholicism in Bolivia
