= Eugenio Coter =

Italian Roman Catholic bishop

His Excellency Eugenio Coter
- Vicar Apostolic of Pando; Titular Bishop of Tibiuca
- Diocese: Vicar Apostolic of Pando
- Appointed: February 2, 2013
- Installed: April 24, 2013
- Predecessor: Luis Morgan Casey
- Other post: Titular Bishop of Tibiuca

Orders
- Ordination: June 20, 1981 by Giulio Oggioni
- Consecration: April 24, 2013 by Luis Morgan Casey

Personal details
- Born: 11 July 1957 (age 69) Gazzaniga (BG), Italy
- Residence: Bishop's House, Riberalta, Bolivia
- Motto: Su misericordia llega a sus fieles

Ordination history of Eugenio Coter
History
Priestly ordination
- Ordained by: Giulio Oggioni (Bergamo)
Episcopal consecration
- Principal consecrator: Luis Morgan Casey (Pando Ap. Vic. em.)
- Co-consecrators: Julio Card. Terrazas Sandoval CSsR (Santa Cruz de la Sierra); Tito Solari Capellari SDB (Cochabamba)

Styles of Eugenio Coter
- Spoken style: His Excellency
- Religious style: Your Excellency

Eugenio Coter (born July 11, 1957) is a Roman Catholic bishop in the Apostolic Vicariate of Pando, Bolivia.

== Diocesan service in Italy and Bolivia ==
He was born in 1957 in Gazzaniga, a village in the province of Bergamo (Italy). He was ordained a priest in the Diocese of Bergamo on June 20, 1981. From 1981 to 1991, Bishop Coter was a priest within the Diocese of Bergamo, serving as associate pastor of Grassobbio and Gandino.

After attending a course at the Missionary Centre (CMU) in Verona, he was sent fidei donum priest in Bolivia in 1991. Serving the Archdiocese of Cochabamba he was parochial vicar in Sacaba and Villa Tunari, and then parish priest in Condebamba of Cochabamba (from 1996 to 2000). For the Archdiocese of Cochabamba he was also member and president of the Foundation "San Lucas", legal representative of the "Celim" NGO of the diocese of Bergamo in Bolivia, member of the Diocesan Pastoral Council.

Since 2000 he has been Episcopal Delegate for the Pastoral Social-Caritas of Cochabamba, and since 2012 spiritual director of the Archdiocesan Major Seminary "San Luis" of Cochabamba. He is also president of the Bolivian Blood Donors' Association (ABDS).

== Episcopate ==
On February 2, 2013, he was elected Titular Bishop of Tibiuca and Vicar Apostolic of Pando. On April 24, 2013, he was consecrated in the Cathedral Church of Riberalta by the bishops Luis Morgan Casey, vicar apostolic emeritus of Pando, cardinal Julio Terrazas Sandoval, archbishop of Santa Cruz de la Sierra, and Tito Solari Capellari, archbishop of Cochabamba.

In November, 2015, Coter was appointed President of Caritas Bolivia.

Catholic Church titles
Preceded by Andrew Yeom Soo-jung	— TITULAR — Titular Bishop of Thibiuca; 2 February 2013 – present	Incumbent
