= Thomas Patrick Collins =

American-born Catholic missionary and bishop

Most Reverend Thomas P. Collins, M.M.
- Vicar Apostolic of Pando
- Church: Catholic Church
- See: Titular See of Sufetula
- Appointed: November 15, 1960
- In office: March 7, 1961 - November 1968

Orders
- Ordination: June 21, 1942
- Consecration: March 7, 1961 by Hugh Aloysius Donohoe

Personal details
- Born: January 13, 1915 San Francisco, California
- Died: December 7, 1973 (aged 58) Rhinebeck, New York

Thomas Patrick Collins, M.M. (January 13, 1915 – December 7, 1973) was an American-born Catholic missionary and bishop. As a member of the Catholic Foreign Mission Society of America (Maryknoll) he was assigned to missions in Bolivia. He served as the Vicar Apostolic of the Pando from 1961 to 1968.

== Early life and education ==
Thomas Collins was born in the San Francisco, California, and was one of seven children. He was educated at Sacred Heart School and studied for the priesthood at seminaries in Mountain View, California, and Venard before being ordained a priest on June 21, 1942.

== Priesthood ==
Brown spent his entire career in the Maryknoll Misson in Bolivia. He did pastoral work in a mission station 150 miles (241 km) from the Mission Center at Riberalta.

== Episcopacy ==
Pope John XXIII appointed Collins as the Titular Bishop of Sufetula and Vicar Apostolic of Pando on November 15, 1960. He was consecrated by Auxiliary Bishop Hugh Donohoe of San Francisco at the Cathedral of Saint Mary of the Assumption in San Francisco on March 7, 1961. The principal co-consecrators were San Francisco Auxiliary Bishop Merlin Guilfoyle and Bishop John Comber, M.M., the Maryknoll Superior General. Collins attended all four sessions of the Second Vatican Council (1962-1965). In 1967 he returned to Mountain View for medical treatment. His resignation for health reasons was accepted by Pope Paul VI in November 1968.

== Later life and death ==
Bishop Collins became a resident at the Ferncliff Nursing Home in Rhinebeck, New York. He died there on December 7, 1973, at the age of 58. His funeral was celebrated at Our Lady Queen of Apostles Chapel in the Maryknoll Center and was buried in the Maryknoll Cemetery.
