= Catholic Church in Ecuador =

The Catholic Church in Ecuador comprises only a Latin hierarchy, united in a national episcopal conference, which comprises:

- Four ecclesiastical provinces, each province is headed by the Metropolitanan archbishop of an archdiocese, and a total of 14 suffragan dioceses.
- Are also eight pre-diocesan, missionary Apostolic Vicariates, headed by titular bishops
- One Military Ordinariate in (and for the armed forces in all) Ecuador.

The Metropolitan Archbishopric of Quito is the Primatial see of Ecuador.

There is an apostolic nunciature as papal diplomatic representation (embassy level) in the national capital Quito.

There are no Eastern Catholic jurisdictions and no titular sees. All defunct jurisdictions have current successor sees.

Caritas Ecuador is the official aid organisation of the Catholic Church in the country.

== Current Latin sees ==
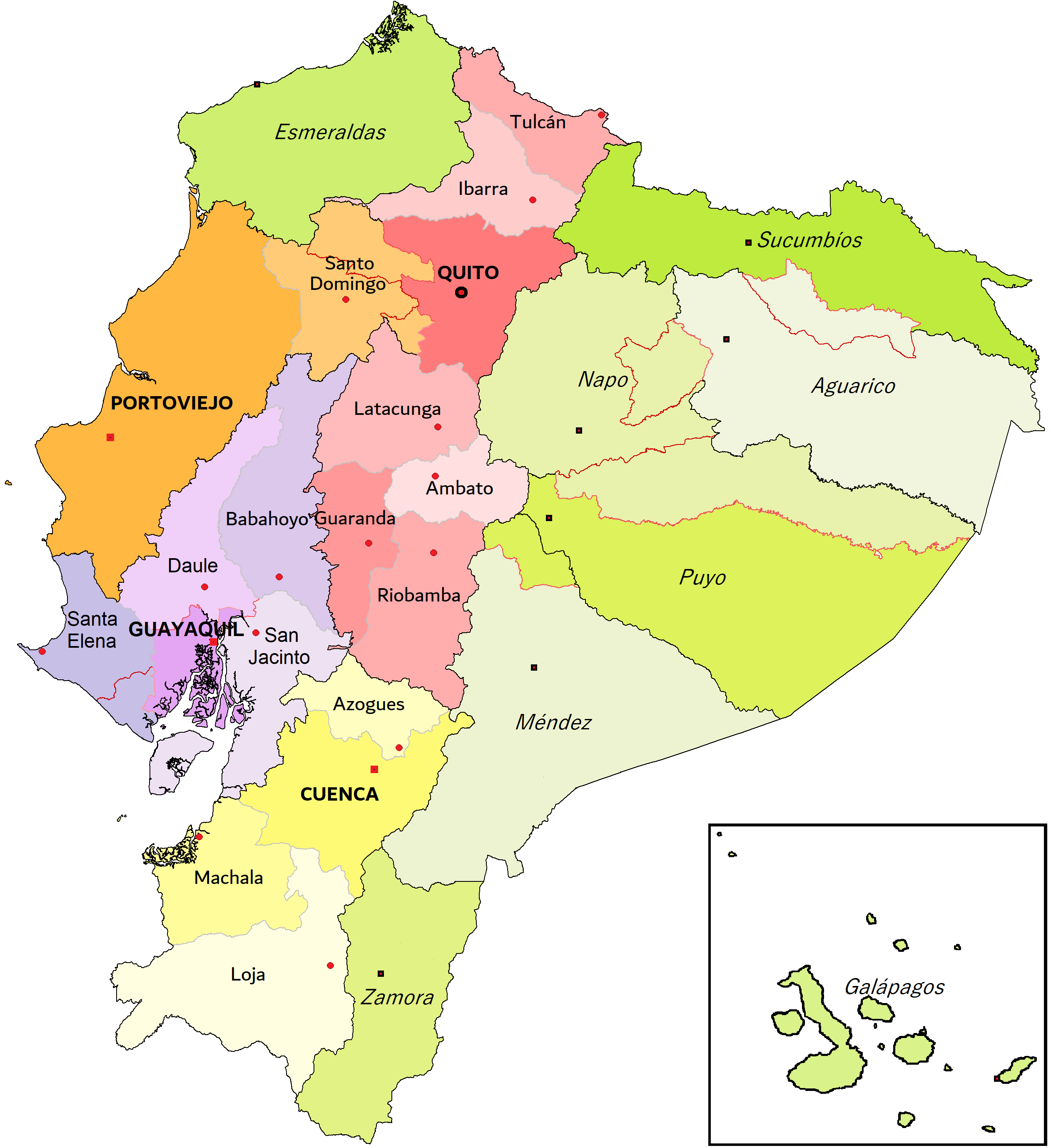
Map of the ecclesiastical jurisdictions of the Catholic Church in Ecuador.

The boundaries of the 24 administrative provinces of Ecuador mostly coincide with the boundaries of most territorial ecclesiastical jurisdictions.

=== Exempt jurisdictions ===
These are directly dependent on the Holy See.

==== Military Ordinariate ====
- Military Ordinariate of Ecuador, an army bishopric

==== Apostolic Vicariates ====
- Apostolic Vicariate of Aguarico
- Apostolic Vicariate of Esmeraldas
- Apostolic Vicariate of Galápagos
- Apostolic Vicariate of Méndez
- Apostolic Vicariate of Napo
- Apostolic Vicariate of Puyo
- Apostolic Vicariate of San Miguel de Sucumbíos
- Apostolic Vicariate of Zamora en Ecuador

=== Ecclesiastical province of Quito ===
- Metropolitan Archdiocese of Quito, primate of Ecuador
  - Diocese of Ambato
  - Diocese of Guaranda
  - Diocese of Ibarra
  - Diocese of Latacunga
  - Diocese of Riobamba
  - Diocese of Tulcán

=== Ecclesiastical province of Cuenca ===
- Metropolitan Archdiocese of Cuenca
  - Diocese of Azogues
  - Diocese of Loja
  - Diocese of Machala

=== Ecclesiastical province of Guayaquil ===
- Metropolitan Archdiocese of Guayaquil
  - Diocese of Babahoyo
  - Diocese of Daule
  - Diocese of San Jacinto
  - Diocese of Santa Elena

=== Ecclesiastical province of Portoviejo ===
- Metropolitan Archdiocese of Portoviejo
  - Diocese of Santo Domingo en Ecuador

== Demographics ==
According to a 2018 survey, Catholics made up 77% of the population of Ecuador. A 2024 Latinobarometro survey found that Catholics made up 65% of the population.

== See also ==
- Religion in Ecuador
- Christianity in Ecuador
- List of Catholic dioceses (structured view)
- Pan-Amazonian Ecclesial Network (REPAM)

== Sources and external links ==
- GCatholic.org - data for all sections.
- Catholic-Hierarchy entry.
- Official website of the Catholic Church in Ecuador (in Spanish)
- Media related to Roman Catholic Church in Ecuador at Wikimedia Commons
