= Miguel Aguilar =

Miguel Aguilar may refer to:

- Miguel Aguilar (baseball) (born 1991), Mexican baseball player
- Miguel Aguilar (Bolivian footballer) (born 1953), Bolivian footballer
- Miguel Aguilar (Salvadoran footballer) (born 1953), Salvadoran football coach
- Miguel Aguilar (Mexican footballer) (born 1993), Mexican footballer
- Miguel Ángel Aguilar Miranda (1939–2025), Ecuadorian Roman Catholic bishop
- Miguel Zerolo Aguilar (born 1957), Canarian politician
