= Puyo =

Puyo may refer to:

- Puyo, Pastaza, the capital of Pastaza, a province in Ecuador
- Buyeo or Puyŏ, an ancient Korean kingdom
- Buyeo County, in South Korea
- Puyo (manga artist), a Japanese manga artist
- Puyo Puyo, a Japanese video game series
- Puyo, Su-ngai Kolok, Narathiwat Province, Thailand
- Apostolic Vicariate of Puyo, of the Roman Catholic Church, in Ecuador
- Inés Puyó (1906–1996), Chilean painter
