= Bertram Víctor Wick Enzler =

Swiss bishop

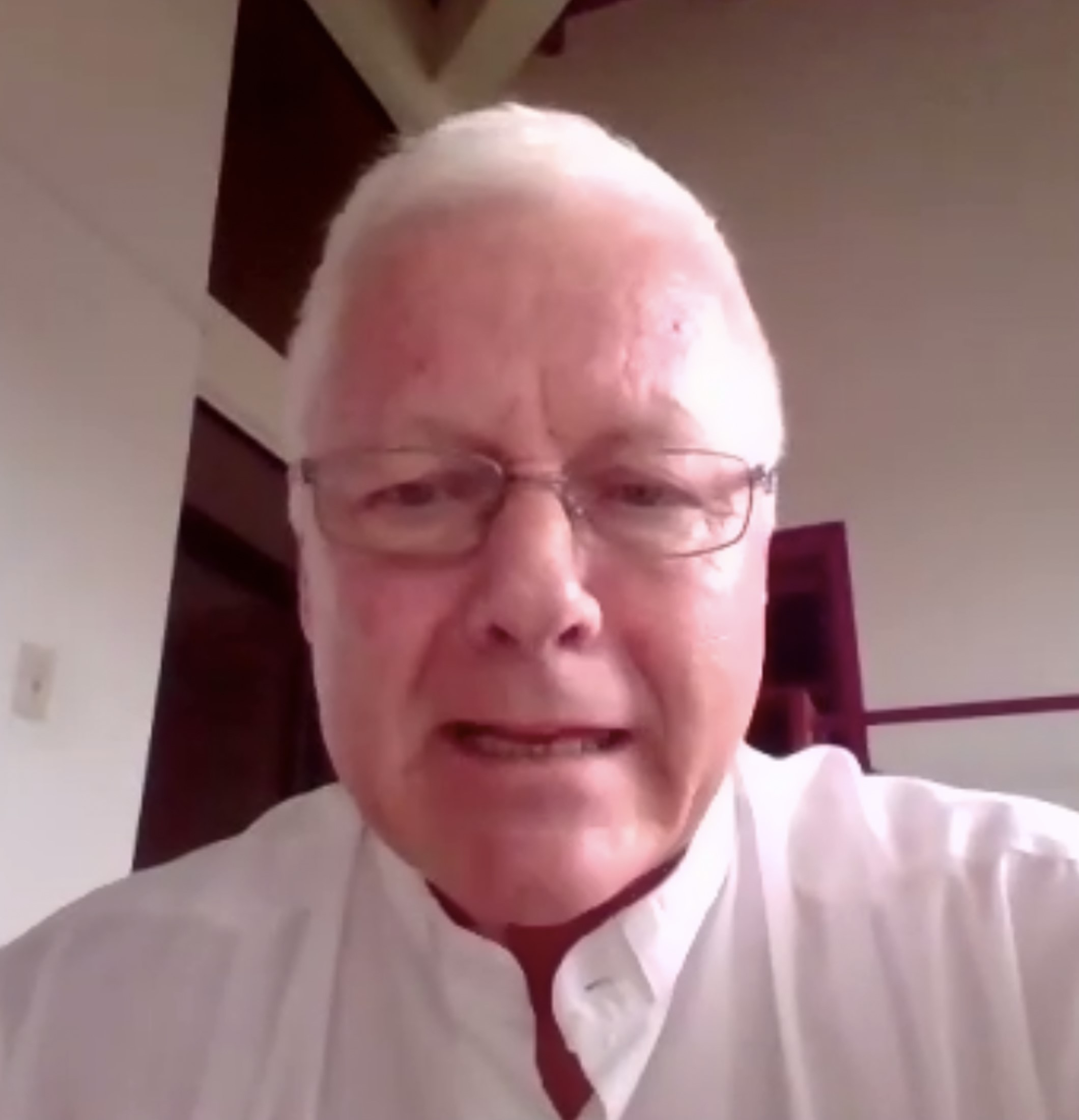
Bertram Víctor Wick Enzler

Bertram Víctor Wick Enzler (born March 8, 1955, in Waldkirch, Switzerland) is a Roman Catholic cleric and Bishop of Santo Domingo de los Colorados in Ecuador.

== Career ==
Bertram Víctor Wick Enzler entered the Catholic seminary in Innsbruck, Austria in 1980. In 1990 he went as a missionary to the Archdiocese of Portoviejo in Ecuador and received the sacrament of Holy Orders for the Archdiocese of Guayaquil on December 8, 1991. Wick Enzler worked in parish pastoral care on the Santa Elena Peninsula, in Guayaquil and subsequently in Los Ceibos. On October 26, 2013, Pope Francis appointed him titular bishop of Carpi and auxiliary bishop in Guayaquil. He was ordained bishop by the Archbishop of Guayaquil, Antonio Arregui Yarza, on November 30 of the same year. Co-consecrators were the Apostolic Nuncio in Ecuador, Archbishop Giacomo Guido Ottonello, and the Archbishop Emeritus of Quito, Raúl Eduardo Cardinal Vela Chiriboga.

Pope Francis appointed Wick Enzler Bishop of Santo Domingo de los Colorados on March 24, 2015. The inauguration took place on May 23 of the same year.

== Dissolution and expulsion of Agnus Dei sect ==
In 2018, Wick Enzler ordered the dissolution of the Agnus Dei Community and the expulsion of its founder, Herbert Grundberger (alias Brother Elija), after learning that Grundberger had been convicted in Germany of child abuse.
