= Paolo Mietto =

Italian priest (1934–2020)

Paolo Mietto CSI
- Vicar Apostolic of Napo
- Church: Catholic Church
- See: Apostolic Vicariate of Napo
- In office: 2 August 1996 – 11 June 2010
- Predecessor: Julio Parise Loro
- Successor: Celmo Lazzari
- Other posts: Titular Bishop of Muzuca in Byzacena (1994-2020); Apostolic Administrator of San Miguel de Sucumbíos (2012-2014)
- Previous posts: Coadjutor Vicar Apostolic of Napo (1994-1996); Superior General of the Congregation of Saint Joseph (1982-1994)

Orders
- Ordination: 30 March 1963
- Consecration: 22 October 1994 by Jozef Tomko

Personal details
- Born: 26 May 1934 Padua, Province of Padua, Kingdom of Italy
- Died: 25 May 2020 (aged 85) Quito, Ecuador

Paolo Mietto (26 May 1934 – 25 May 2020) was an Italian-born Ecuadorian Roman Catholic bishop.

Mietto was born in Italy and was ordained to the priesthood in 1963. He served as titular bishop of Muzuca in Byzacena and as coadjutor vicar apostolic of the Apostolic Vicariate of Napo, Ecuador from 1994 to 1996. He then served as bishop of the Apostolic Vicariate of Napo from 1996 to 2010.
