= Agnus Dei Community =

Catholic sect in Germany

The Agnus Dei Community (German: "Gemeinschaft Lamm Gottes" or "Community of the Lamb of God") is a Catholic sect that is not recognized by ecclesiastic authorities. The group is based at the old Frauenberg Monastery (Burg Frauenberg) near Bodman-Ludwigshafen, Baden-Württemberg, Germany, which is provided free of charge by the property's owner. The community was established in 1980.

== History ==
The founder and leader of the community is Herbert Grundberger. Grundberger commonly goes by the name "Brother Elija" as well as "Hermano Elias" and other names. After dabbling in Buddhism, self-help groups and self-described "esoteric" and "occult" studies, Grundberger claims to have had a decisive encounter with Jesus Christ in 1977 while on a cycling tour of Lake Constance. He began to study the Catholic religion while "living like a monk" in his flat in Tübingen. In April, 1980, along with several like-minded persons and their children, Grundberger founded the Agnus Dei Community. Since about 1982, Count Wilderich von und zu Bodman has granted the Agnus Dei group a center of operations at Frauenberg, a former Cistercian monastery in the hills above Lake Constance. In 1984, Grundberger claimed to receive messages from Jesus and the Virgin Mary. In 2023, Grundberger declared that the face of Jesus Christ had miraculously appeared on a piece of cloth.

== Ecuador and association with Bishop Emil Stehle ==
In 1997, Grundberger and some members of the Agnus Dei community moved to a new center in Ecuador they called "Tierra de la Paz" (Land of Peace) near Santo Domingo de los Colorados. Grundberger came to Santo Domingo at the invitation of Emil Stehle, who served as Bishop of the Diocese of Santo Domingo in Ecuador from 1987 to 2002 and was a native of southern Germany.

A report published in 2022 revealed that during his years as Bishop of Santo Domingo, Stehle had given refuge in his diocese to numerous Catholic priests who were under police investigation for sexual abuse of minors in Germany. Although he is not a priest, Grundberger was named specifically in this report as one of the men who had been under police investigation.

== Criminal conviction and expulsion from Ecuador ==
In a 2018 decree, the new Bishop of Santo Domingo ordered the dissolution of the Agnus Dei group in Ecuador and the liquidation of its properties. According to the 2018 decree, written by Bishop Bertram Víctor Wick Enzler and published by the Catholic Diocese of Santo Domingo in Ecuador, Grundberger was convicted in 2002 by the Konstanz District Court (Baden-Württemberg, Germany) for sexual assaults on children within his community. The decree further states that Grundberger received a one-year prison sentence with probation and a fine of over 10,000 euros.

== Lack of ecclesiastic recognition ==
The Archdiocese of Freiburg in Baden-Württemberg has denied ecclesiastical recognition to the Agnus Dei community.

== Life in the community ==
The community has sustained itself over the years through donations, child welfare benefits, and the sale of audiocassettes, CDs and books. In 2000, the Agnus Dei community was estimated to include 27 adults and 29 children at centers in Germany, Belgium and Ecuador. In 2021, there was an estimated total of 25 members.

== Harpa Dei Choir ==
Beginning in 2011, four siblings raised in the Agnus Dei community have performed in a vocal ensemble called the Harpa Dei Choir. Nikolai, Lucia, Marie-Elisée and Mirjana Gerstner were born in Germany but traveled as children with the sect to Ecuador, where they grew up. The siblings are currently based at the sect's headquarters in Germany and have an extensive presence on YouTube and other social media.

According to Harpa Dei's web site, the siblings consider Grundberger to be their "spiritual father." Members of the choir also often appear in Grundberger's videos on his web site and his other social media channels. Like Grundberger, the siblings wear pseudo-religious green-colored robes in all their videos and public appearances. Under Grundberger's supervision, Harpa Dei have performed in many countries around the world.
