= Diocese of Santo Domingo in Ecuador =

Roman Catholic diocese in Ecuador

Diocese of Santo Domingo en Ecuador Dioecesis Sancti Dominici in Aequatoria

Catholic
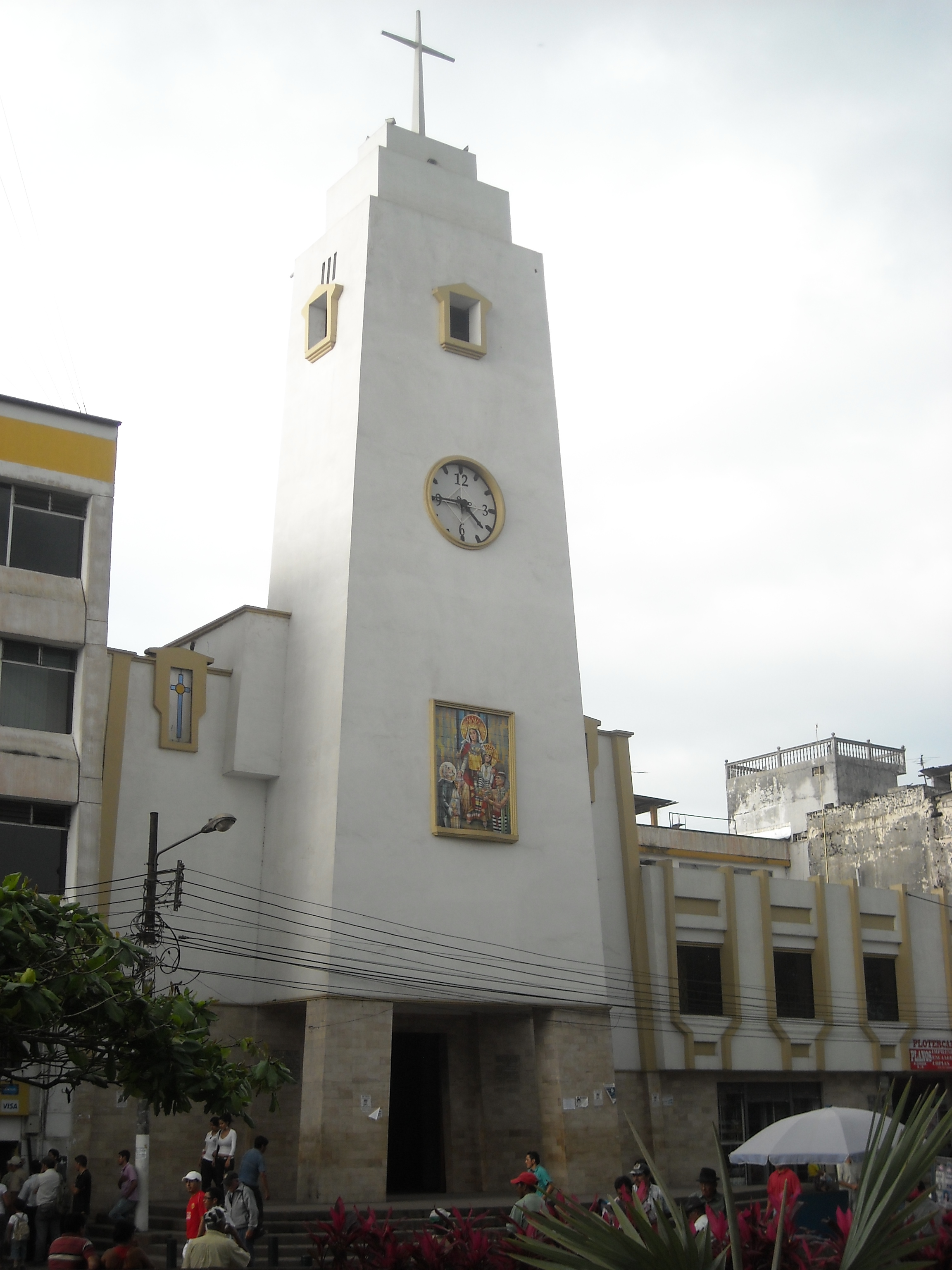
- Cathedral of the Ascension

Location
- Country: Ecuador
- Ecclesiastical province: Province of Portoviejo
- Coordinates: 0°15′0″S 79°9′0″W

Statistics
- Area: 8,500 km^{2} (3,300 sq mi)
- Population: Total; Catholics: (as of 2010); 763,000; 653,000 (85.6%)
- Parishes: 58

Information
- Denomination: Catholic Church
- Sui iuris church: Latin Church
- Rite: Roman Rite
- Established: 5 January 1987 (Erected as Territorial Prelature); 8 August 1996 (Elevated to Diocese)
- Cathedral: Cathedral of La Ascensión

Current leadership
- Pope: Leo XIV
- Bishop: Bertram Víctor Wick Enzler; appointed by Pope Francis on Tuesday, 24 March 2015; formerly, Auxiliary Bishop of the Roman Catholic Archdiocese of Guayaquil, in Guayaquil, Ecuador

Map
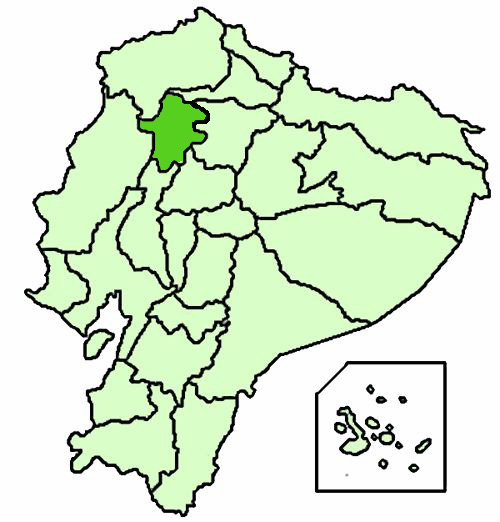

The Diocese of Santo Domingo in Ecuador (Latin: Dioecesis Sancti Dominici in Aequatoria) is a Latin Church ecclesiastical territory of the Catholic Church in northern Ecuador. It is a suffragan diocese in the ecclesiastical province of the metropolitan Archdiocese of Portoviejo.

Its cathedral is the Catedral La Ascensión del Señor, dedicated to the Ascension, in the episcopal see of Santo Domingo de Los Colorados in Santo Domingo de los Tsáchilas Province, where a future cathedral is also under construction, the Catedral El Buen Pastor, dedicated to the Good Shepherd.

== History ==
- Erected on 5 January 1987 as Territorial Prelature of Santo Domingo de los Colorados, on territory split off from the Roman Catholic Archdiocese of Quito
- On 8 August 1996 elevated to bishopric as Diocese of Santo Domingo de los Colorados.
- Renamed on 18 June 2008 as the Diocese of Santo Domingo en Ecuador.

== Statistics ==
As per 2014, it pastorally served 785,000 Catholics (92.4% of 850,000 total) on 8,500 km² in 57 parishes and 381 missions with 87 priests (56 diocesan, 31 religious), 2 deacons, 120 lay religious (33 brothers, 87 sisters) and 18 seminarians.

== Episcopal ordinaries ==
Territorial Prelate of Santo Domingo de Los Colorados

- Emilio Lorenzo Stehle (born Germany) (5 Jan 1987 – 8 August 1996 see below), Titular Bishop of Eraclea (1983.07.16 – 1987.01.05), previously Auxiliary Bishop of Archdiocese of Quito (Ecuador) (1983.07.16 – 1987.01.05)

Suffragan Bishops of Santo Domingo de Los Colorados

- Emilio Lorenzo Stehle (see above 8 August 1996 – retired 11 May 2002); died 16 May 2017
- Wilson Abraham Moncayo Jalil (11 May 2002 – 18 June 2008 see below)

Suffragan Bishops of Santo Domingo in Ecuador

- Wilson Abraham Moncayo Jalil (see above 18 June 2008 – death 12 March 2012)
- Apostolic Administrator Julio César Terán Dutari, Jesuit Order (S.J.) (born Panama) (2012.03.15 – 2015.03.24), former Bishop of Ibarra (Ecuador) (2004.02.14 – retired 2011.03.25)
- Bertram Víctor Wick Enzler (born Switzerland) (24 March 2015 – ...); previously Titular Bishop of Carpi (2013.10.26 – 2015.03.24) as Auxiliary Bishop of the Roman Catholic Archdiocese of Guayaquil (Ecuador) (2013.10.26 – 2015.03.24).

== See also ==
- List of Catholic Dioceses in Ecuador
- Roman Catholicism in Ecuador
- Roman Catholic Archdiocese of Santo Domingo (Dominican Republic)

== Sources and external links ==
- GCatholic.org entry, with Google map and satellite photo - data for all sections
- Catholic Hierarchy entry
