= Miguel Ángel Aguilar Miranda =

Ecuadorian Roman Catholic prelate (1939–2025)

His Excellency Miguel Ángel Aguilar Miranda
- Military Ordinariate Emeritus of Ecuador
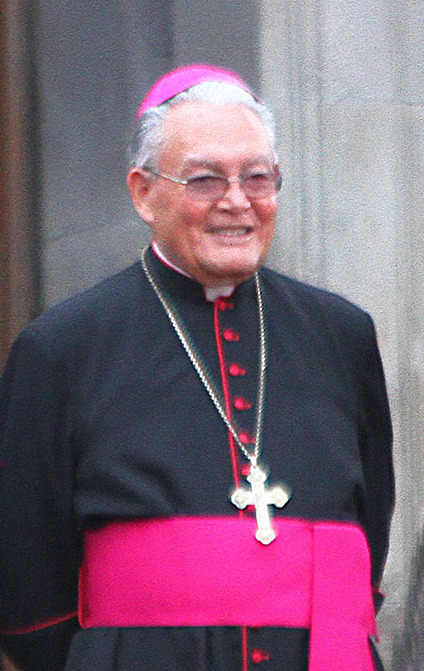
- Appointed: 14 February 2004
- Term ended: 18 June 2014
- Predecessor: Raúl Eduardo Vela Chiriboga
- Successor: Segundo René Coba Galarza
- Previous post: Bishop of Guaranda (1991–2004)

Orders
- Ordination: 29 June 1965
- Consecration: 4 May 1991 by Antonio José González Zumárraga

Personal details
- Born: 5 April 1939 Quito, Ecuador
- Died: 1 April 2025 (aged 85)

Miguel Ángel Aguilar Miranda (5 April 1939 – 1 April 2025) was an Ecuadorian Roman Catholic prelate. He was bishop of Guaranda from 1991 to 2004 and Military Ordinariate of Ecuador from 2004 to 2014. Aguilar Miranda died on 1 April 2025, at the age of 85.

Catholic Church titles
Preceded by Raúl Eduardo Vela Chiriboga	Military Ordinariate of Ecuador; 2004–2014	Succeeded by Segundo René Coba Galarza
Preceded by Raúl Holguer López Mayorga	Bishop of Guaranda; 1991–2004	Succeeded by Ángel Polivio Sánchez Loaiza
