= Roman Catholic Diocese of Santo Domingo =

(Roman Catholic) Diocese of Santo Domingo may refer to the following ecclesiastical jurisdictions in Latin America with a see called Santo Domingo (after Saint Dominic) :

- the present Roman Catholic Diocese of Santo Domingo in Ecuador
- the Antillian former Roman Catholic Archdiocese of Santo Domingo#History in the Dominican Republic, now a Metropolitan Archdiocese
