= Apostolic Vicariate of the Congo =

The Roman Catholic Vicariate Apostolic of the Congo, the administrative region covering Catholic mission activity in the Congo area of Central Africa, was by the end of the nineteenth century already fragmented.

The first vicar apostolic appointed for Congo was in 1518, and the intended territory was within modern northern Angola.

Over a period of about eighty years, from 1880, the territory of the present Democratic Republic of Congo became divided into dioceses with their bishops, with apostolic vicariates being the intermediate stage.

== Early missions ==
The evangelisation of the Congo began as early as 1484, when Diogo Cam discovered the mouth of the Congo River, known as Zaire until the seventeenth century. Cam's naval chaplain set himself at once to preach to the natives, and won to Christianity the chief of the Sogno, a village on the right bank of the Congo, where he first landed. Some of the inhabitants of this village accompanied Cam on his return voyage and were solemnly baptised at the court of John II of Portugal.

Later, the head chief of the Banza-Congo (known as São Salvador in Portuguese from 1570 to 1975) asked King John for missionaries. Three were sent (whether they were Dominicans or Franciscans or members of a Lisbon chapter isn't known); they finally baptised the head chief and many other subordinate ones at Banza-Congo, in a wooden structure called the Church of the Holy Cross. In 1518, a grandson of this chief, known as Henry, who had been ordained in Portugal, was made titular bishop of Utica and appointed by Leo X Vicar Apostolic of Congo. He died before quitting Europe.

From the beginning the Portuguese undertook to introduce Portuguese customs in Congo. At the beginning of the seventeenth century, a native chief, Alvarez II, sent one of his relatives, a marquis, as his representative to the papal court. The ambassador arrived in Rome in a dying condition, and expired the day after his arrival, the eve of the Epiphany, 1608. Pope Paul V, who personally assisted the ambassador in his last moments, gave him a magnificent state funeral and erected to his memory a monument at St. Mary Major's. Later, Pope Urban VIII had a mausoleum erected to him by Bernini; it still stands at the entrance to the choir of the basilica.

The Dominicans, Franciscans, Carmelites and Jesuits were the first missionaries of the Congo. Their labours were trying, and rather fruitless. In the seventeenth century, the Jesuits had two colleges, one at Loanda, another, of minor importance, at San Salvador. On the whole, Christianity never took firm root and was soon brought into discredit by the slave-trading Portuguese. While the Portuguese always confined themselves to the Lower Congo, as early as the seventeenth century the missionaries had traversed the course of the Zaire and a seventeenth-century map has been discovered which traces the river according to data supplied by them.

== Timeline ==
- 1640: The Prefecture Apostolic of Portuguese Congo is founded
- The mission of the Upper Congo was begun in 1880; it was erected into the Vicariate Apostolic of Upper Congo in 1895
- Vicariate Apostolic of Belgian Congo
- Vicariate Apostolic of French Congo
- Vicariate Apostolic of Congo Free State
- 1886: The Vicariate Apostolic of Loango (or French Congo, or Lower Congo) was detached from the Vicariate Apostolic of Gaboon
- 1886: Mission created, in 1888 the Apostolic Vicariate of Léopoldville, from the Apostolic Prefecture of Lower Congo and the Apostolic Vicariate of Two Guineas
- 1887: Apostolic Vicariate of Upper Congo was created from the Apostolic Vicariate of Tanganyika
- The Vicariate Apostolic of Ubanghi (Upper French Congo) was created in 1890
- 1892: The mission of Kwango is detached from the Vicariate Apostolic of Belgian Congo, and in 1903 becomes the Prefecture Apostolic of Kwango
- 1901: The Prefecture Apostolic of Upper Kassai is created from the Vicariate Apostolic of Belgian Congo
- In 1909 the Prefecture Apostolic of Ubanghi-Chari was created from the Vicariate Apostolic of Ubanghi; it covered parts of what is now Chad
- The Katanga mission was separated from the Vicariate Apostolic of Belgian Congo in 1910 The Matadi mission likewise was separated in 1911 Also in 1911, the Prefecture Apostolic of Belgian Ubanghi was created from the Vicariate Apostolic of Belgian Congo
- 1929: Apostolic Vicariate of Kivu created from the Apostolic Vicariate of Upper Congo
- 1952: Apostolic Vicariate of Kasongo created from the Apostolic Vicariate of Baudouinville and the Apostolic Vicariate of Kivu
