= Pietro Gabrielli =

Italian-born Ecuadorian Roman Catholic prelate (1931–2026)

The Most Reverend Pietro Gabrielli S.D.B.
- Apostolic Vicar Emeritus of Méndez
- Church: Catholic Church
- Diocese: Apostolic Vicariate of Méndez
- Appointed: 1 July 1993
- Term ended: 15 April 2008
- Predecessor: Teodoro Luis Arroyo Robelly
- Successor: Néstor Montesdeoca Becerra
- Other post: Titular Bishop of Taparura (1993–2026)

Orders
- Ordination: 29 June 1962
- Consecration: 19 September 1993

Personal details
- Born: 17 March 1931 Pove del Grappa, Kingdom of Italy
- Died: 6 February 2026 (aged 94) Macas, Ecuador
- Denomination: Roman Catholic

Pietro Gabrielli S.D.B. (17 March 1931 – 6 February 2026) was an Italian-born Roman Catholic prelate and member of the Salesians of Don Bosco who served as Vicar Apostolic of Méndez in Ecuador from 1993 until his retirement in 2008.

== Early life and priesthood ==
Pietro Gabrielli was born on 17 March 1931 in Pove del Grappa, in the Province of Vicenza, Italy. He joined the Salesians of Don Bosco (Society of Saint Francis de Sales), made a solemn profession in 1958 and was ordained to the priesthood on 29 June 1962.

After his ordination, Gabrielli was sent as a missionary to Ecuador, where he carried out pastoral work for several decades within the Apostolic Vicariate of Méndez. He served as a parish priest and missionary among rural and indigenous communities of the Amazon region.

== Episcopal ministry ==
On 1 July 1993, Pope John Paul II appointed Gabrielli as Vicar Apostolic of Méndez and Titular Bishop of Taparura. He received episcopal consecration on 19 September 1993.

As Vicar Apostolic, Gabrielli led the missionary jurisdiction covering much of the eastern Ecuadorian Amazon, emphasizing evangelization, pastoral closeness, and frequent visitation of remote communities.

== Retirement ==
Upon reaching the canonical retirement age, Gabrielli submitted his resignation, which was accepted by Pope Benedict XVI on 15 April 2008. He was succeeded by Néstor Montesdeoca Becerra, S.D.B.

== Death ==
Gabrielli died in Macas, Ecuador on 6 February 2026, at the age of 94.

== Legacy ==
Gabrielli is remembered for his long missionary service in Ecuador and his close pastoral relationship with the people of the Amazon region, whom he continued to visit even after retirement.

Catholic Church titles
| Preceded by Teodoro Luis Arroyo Robelly | Apostolic Vicar of Méndez; 1993–2008 | Succeeded by Néstor Montesdeoca Becerra |
| Preceded by Gilbert Sheldon | Titular Bishop of Taparura; 1993–2026 | Succeeded by Vacant |
