= Apostolic Vicariate of San Miguel de Sucumbíos =

Catholic missionary jurisdiction in Ecuador

Apostolic Vicariate of San Miguel de Sucumbíos Apostolicus Vicariatus Sancti Michaëlis de Sucumbios

Location
- Country: Ecuador

Statistics
- Area: 13,287 km^{2} (5,130 sq mi)
- Population: Total; Catholics: (as of 2010); 139,000; 111,000 (79.9%)
- Parishes: 41

Information
- Denomination: Catholic Church
- Rite: Roman Rite
- Established: 16 April 1924 (102 years ago)
- Cathedral: Catedral Nuestra Señora del Cisne

Current leadership
- Pope: Leo XIV
- Vicar Apostolic: Moacir Goulart de Figueredo, M.S.C.

Map
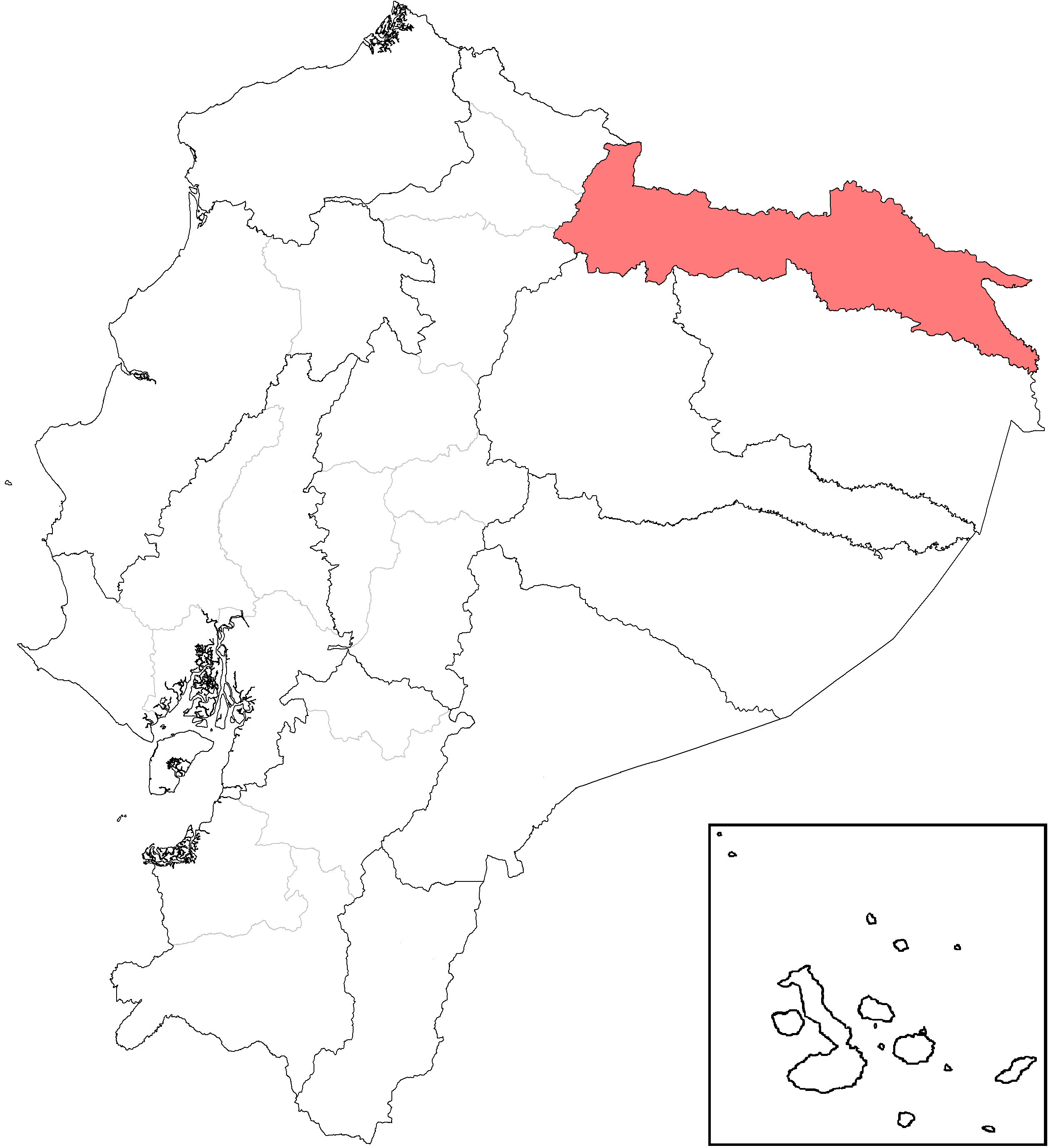

The Apostolic Vicariate (or Vicariate Apostolic) of San Miguel de Sucumbíos (Latin: Apostolicus Vicariatus Sancti Michaëlis de Sucumbios) is a missionary entity of the Roman Catholic Church. Its cathedral see, the Catedral Nuestra Señora del Cisne, is located in the city of Nueva Loja, Sucumbíos Province in Ecuador.

== History ==
On 16 April 1924 Pope Pius XI established the Prefecture Apostolic of San Miguel de Sucumbíos from the Apostolic Vicariate of Napo.

Pope John Paul II elevated it to an Apostolic Vicariate on 2 July 1984. It remains exempt, i.e. directly subject to the Holy See, not part of an ecclesiastical province.

=== Nomination conflict with the Ecuadorian state ===
In October 2010, after López Marañon of the Discalced Carmelites retired at the mandatory age of 75, the Holy See appointed Rafael Ibarguren, of the Heralds of the Gospel as Apostolic Administrator (ad interim for the Ordinary) of the Vicariate Apostolic. Ecuadorian President Rafael Correa objected to the nomination as he considered Ibarguren 'ultraconservative and fundamentalist', he also feared that Ibarguren would destroy all the social work his predecessor had achieved. Correa asserted that he could veto the nomination of Ibarguren on the basis of a Modus vivendi agreement between Ecuador and the Holy See. The Episcopal Conference of Ecuador asserted otherwise. Relations between the two entities were strained and believers within Sucumbíos were divided in those supporting the Heralds of the Gospel and those who did not.

On 5 December 2011, Pope Benedict XVI named Paolo Mietto Apolostic Administrator. This member of the missionary Congregation of Saint Joseph was succeeded by a fellow Josephite Celmo Lazzari, the former Apostolic Vicar of neighbouring 'mother vicariate' Napo, as Apostolic vicar.

== Incumbent Ordinaries ==
Apostolic prefects (all OCD)

- Pacifico del Carmine, OCD † (21 May 1937 – 1954), resigned
- Manuel Gomez Frande, OCD † (18 November 1955 – 1968)
- Gonzalo López Marañon, OCD † (26 June 1970 – see below)

Apostolic vicars

- Gonzalo López Marañon, OCD † (see above – 30 October 2010), retired
  - Apostolic Administrator Rafael Ibarguren Schindler (30 October 2010 – 10 February 2012)
  - Apostolic Administrator Paolo Mietto, CSI (10 February 2012 – 21 November 2013)
- Celmo Lazzari, CSI (21 November 2013 – 23 October 2024), appointed Vicar Apostolic of Napo
  - Apostolic Administrator Celmo Lazzari, CSI (23 October 2024 – 8 January 2025)
- Moacir Goulart de Figueredo, MSC (23 October 2024 – Present)

== See also ==
- Roman Catholicism in Ecuador
