= Nikolaus Bodman =

German ornithologist

Baron Johann Nikolaus von Bodman (23 February 1903 in Bodman – 25 October 1988 in Radolfzell) was a German nobleman, ornithologist and bird conservationist who helped establish the Radolfzell bird observatory at his castle in Möggingen. It was incorporated into the Max Planck Society in 1949 and added to the Max Planck Institute for Behavioural Physiology in 1959.

== Life ==
Bodman was the younger son of Count Othmar von Bodman and Countess Maria von Walderdorff. He went to school in the Ettal monastery in Bavaria and the high school at Ravensberg and Bad Wörishofen. He then studied at the University of Bonn. In June 1927 he went on a research trip to the Balearic Islands with Adolf von Jordan of the Museum Alexander König and worked for a while as an intern on the estate of Count Brühl near Cottbus. He married Antonia Josepha Huberta Maria and they had three children. Bodman served in the war years from 1941 to 1945 in France.

Bodman co-founded the Süddeutsche Vogelwarte in 1928 and helped set up the Vogelwarte Radolfzell on Lake Constance and worked on bird conservation measures in the area.
