= Julio Parise Loro =

Julio Parise Loro, C.S.I.
- Vicar Apostolic of Vicariate Apostolic of Napo Emeritus
- Church: Roman Catholic Church
- See: Vicariate Apostolic of Napo
- In office: 1978–1996
- Predecessor: Maximiliano Spiller, C.S.I.
- Successor: Paolo Mietto, C.S.I.

Orders
- Ordination: 15 August 1944

Personal details
- Born: 21 July 1920 Cologna Veneta, Italy
- Died: 5 October 2010 (aged 90)

Julio Parise Loro (21 July 1920 – 5 October 2010) was an Italian prelate of the Roman Catholic Church.

Loro was born in Cologna Veneta, Italy and was ordained a priest on 15 August 1944 from the Roman Catholic religious order of the Institute of Consecrated Life. Loro was appointed auxiliary bishop of the Apostolic Vicariate of Napo as well as titular bishop of Thagamuta on 5 October 1974 and was ordained bishop on 8 December 1974. Loro was appointed Vicar Apostolic of the Apostolic Vicariate of Napo on 27 April 1978 and served until his retirement on 2 August 1996.
