= Bodman-Ludwigshafen =

- Municipality
- Coat of arms

- Location of Bodman-Ludwigshafen within Konstanz district
- Interactive map of Bodman-Ludwigshafen
- Location within Germany Location within Baden-Württemberg
- Coordinates: 47°49′04″N 09°03′28″E
- Country: Germany
- State: Baden-Württemberg
- Admin. region: Freiburg
- District: Konstanz

Government
  - Mayor (2023–31): Christoph Stolz

Area
  - Total: 28.04 km^{2} (10.83 sq mi)
- Elevation: 410 m (1,350 ft)

Population (2025-12-31)
  - Total: 4,763
  - Density: 169.9/km^{2} (439.9/sq mi)
- Time zone: UTC+01:00 (CET)
  - Summer (DST): UTC+02:00 (CEST)
- Postal codes: 78351
- Dialling codes: 07773
- Vehicle registration: KN
- Website: www.bodman-ludwigshafen.de

Bodman-Ludwigshafen is a municipality in the district of Konstanz in Baden-Württemberg in Germany, located on the most western shore of Lake Überlingen, the north-western part of the Upper Lake of Lake Constance (German: Bodensee). The municipality consists of the two separate villages Bodman and Ludwigshafen on each side of Lake Überlingen. In 1975, the former municipalities Ludwigshafen am Bodensee and Bodman united to the current administrative situation. The German term for Lake Constance, Bodensee, derives from Bodman.

The Agnus Dei sect is based at the old Frauenberg Monastery (Burg Frauenberg) near Bodman-Ludwigshafen.

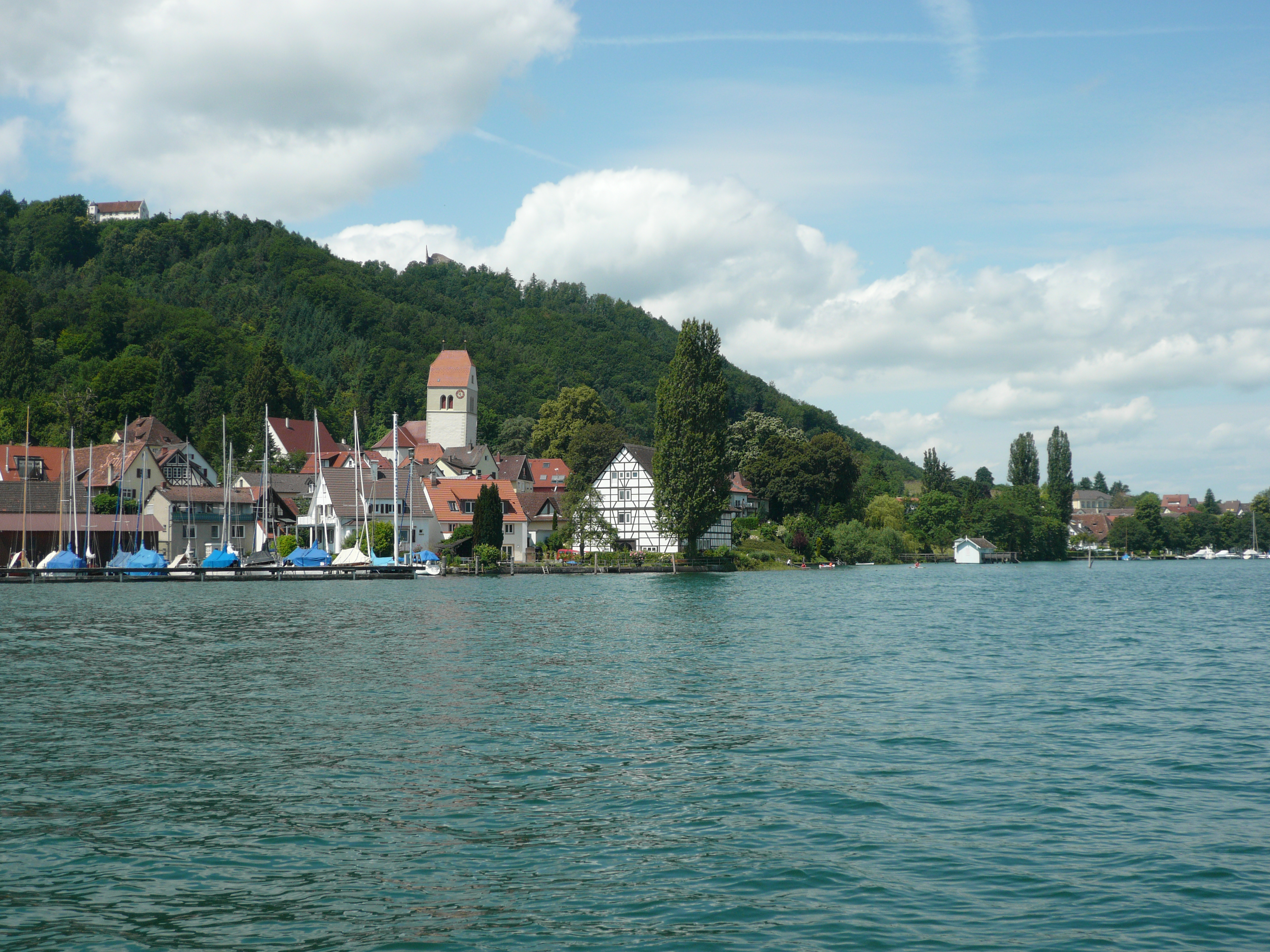
Bodman seaside

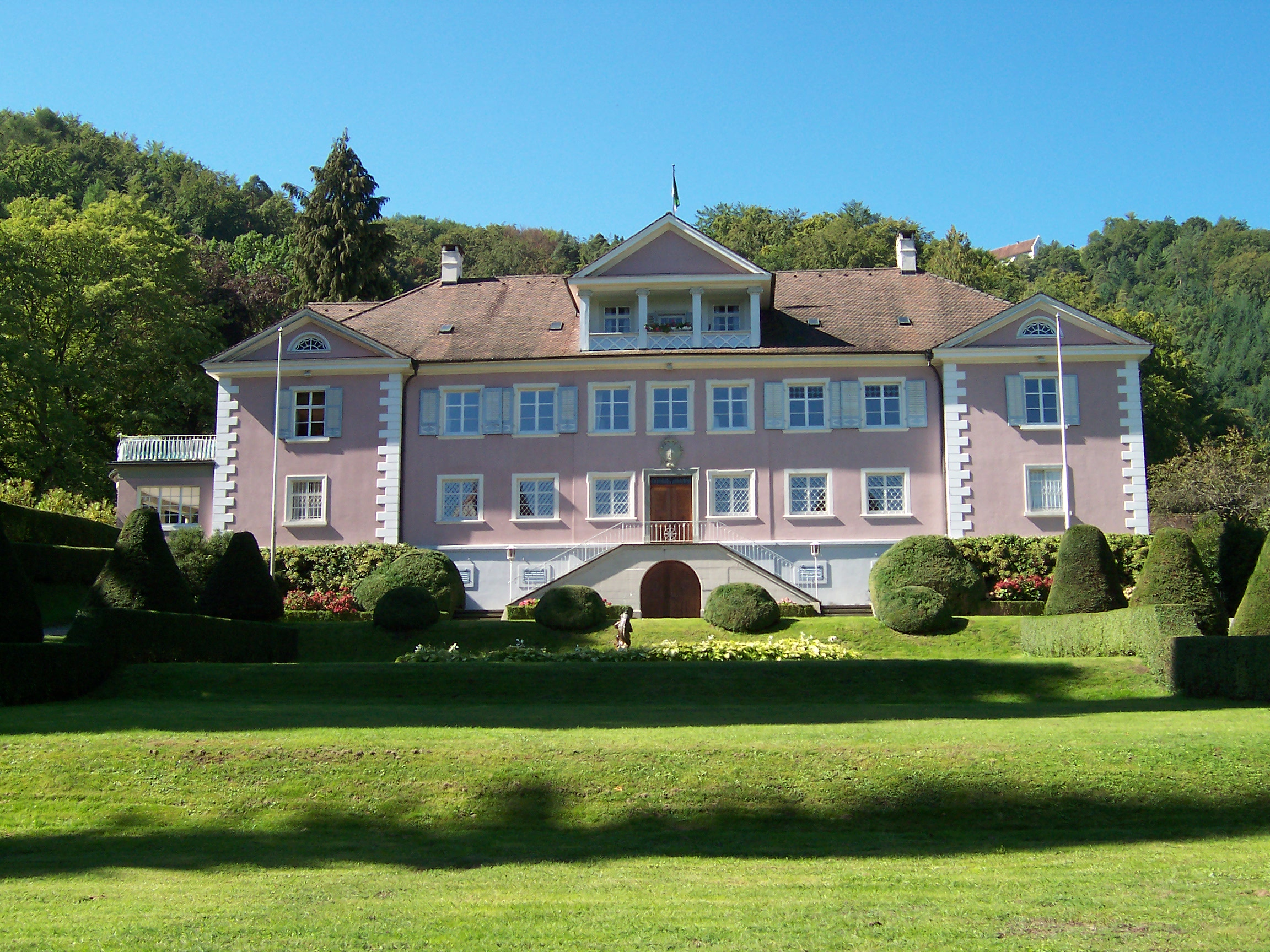
Palace Bodman

== Toponymy ==
The name of the village probably originally derived from the Old High German bodamon which meant "on the soils", indicating a place on level terrain by the lake. This place, situated at the west end of Lake Überlingen (Überlinger See), had a more supraregional character for a certain period in the early Middle Ages as a Frankish imperial palace (Königspfalz), Alamannian ducal seat and mint, which is why the name may have been transferred to the lake which Bodman is situated (Bodmansee, "Bodman's lake"). From 833 or 834 AD, the region surrounding the village and lake appears in Latin sources as lacus potamicus.

== World heritage site ==
It is home to one or more prehistoric pile-dwelling (or stilt house) settlements that are part of the Prehistoric Pile dwellings around the Alps UNESCO World Heritage Site.

== Twin towns ==
Bodman-Ludwigshafen is twinned with:

- Mügeln, Germany, since 2000

== People ==
- Johannes Wolfgang von Bodman (1651–1691), German Roman Catholic auxiliary bishop
- Franz von und zu Bodman (1835–1906), German politician
- Sophie Ley (1849–1918), German painter
- Nikolaus Bodman (1903–1988), German nobleman, ornithologist, and bird conservationist
