= José Mario Ruiz Navas =

Ecuadorian Bishop (1930–2020)

- Archbishop of Portoviejo
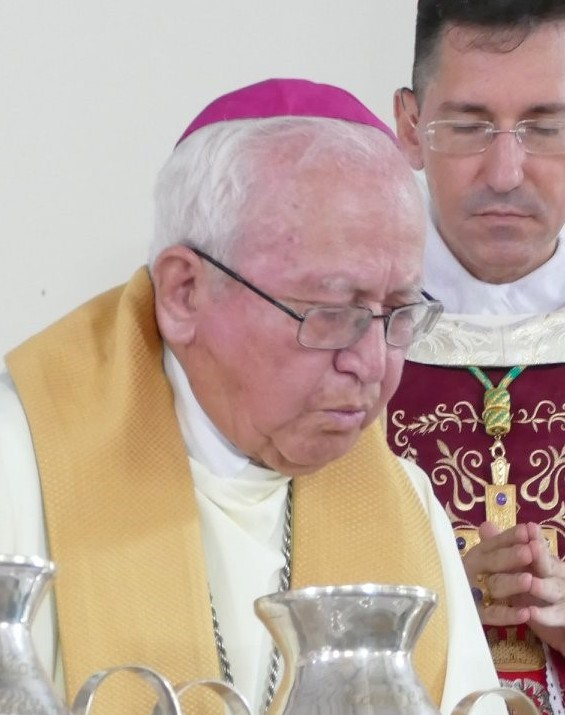
- The Most Reverend José Ruiz Navas at a Chrism Mass in 2019
- Church: Catholic Church
- Archdiocese: Archdiocese of Portoviejo
- In office: 6 August 1989 – 6 August 2007
- Predecessor: Luis Alfredo Carvajal Rosales
- Successor: Lorenzo Voltolini Esti
- Previous post: Bishop of Latacugna (1968-1989)

Orders
- Ordination: 17 April 1954
- Consecration: 12 January 1969 by Giovanni Ferrofino

Personal details
- Born: 20 July 1930 Pujilí, León Province, Ecuador
- Died: 10 December 2020 (aged 90) Pujilí, Cotopaxi Province, Ecuador

José Mario Ruiz Navas (20 July 1930 – 10 December 2020) was an Ecuadorian Roman Catholic archbishop.

Ruiz Navas was born in Ecuador and was ordained to the priesthood in 1954.

He served as bishop of the Roman Catholic Diocese of Latacunga, Ecuador, from 1968 to 1989 and then as bishop and then archbishop of the Roman Catholic Archdiocese of Portoviejo, Ecuador, from 1989 to 2007.

Navas died from COVID-19 in 2020.
