= Henchir Bir Jedi =

Town in Tunisia

Coordinates: 36.9144°N 10.8033°E

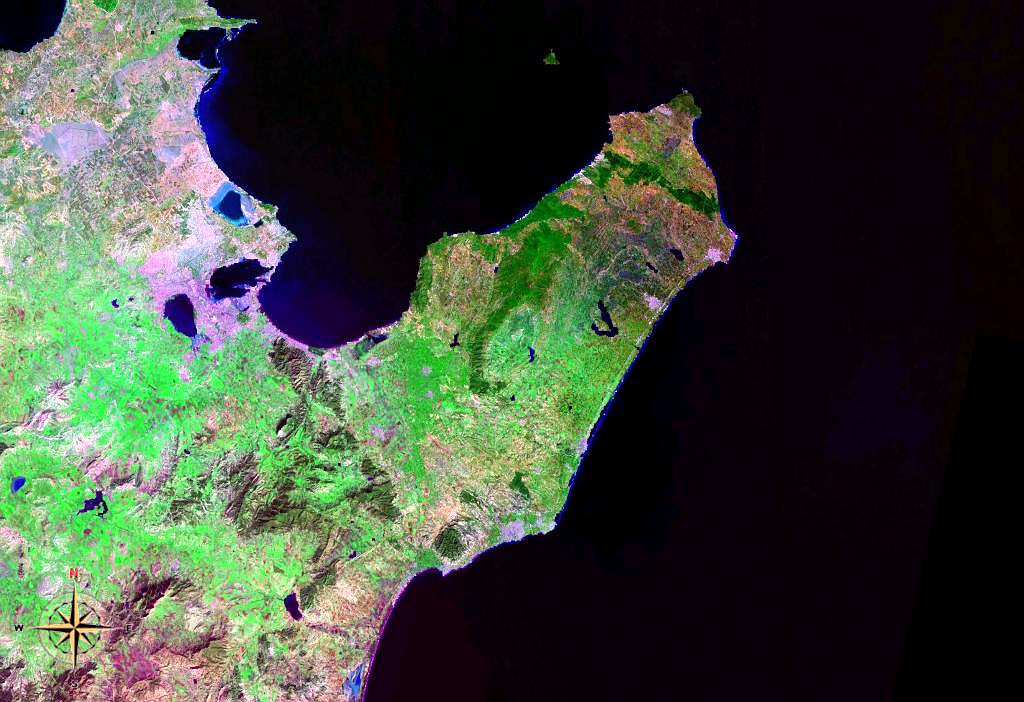
Area around Henchir Bir Jedi from space (false color)

Henchir Bir Jedi is a town in Nabeul Governorate, Tunisia.

Henchir Bir Jedi is on the north coast of the Cape Bon peninsula, overlooking the Mediterranean Sea and near to Douar Zougjag, Dar el Haj Ali and Ra's Degbi Marsa.

The town is about 20 kilometers east of Tunis, and takes its name for a series of ruins at the town. Another set of ruins at El Mraïssa lies to the west of the town.
