= Apostolic Vicariate of San Andrés y Providencia =

Catholic missionary jurisdiction in Colombia

Apostolic Vicariate of San Andrés y Providencia Apostolicus Vicariatus Sancti Andreae et Providentiae Vicariato Apostólico de San Andrés y Providencia

Location
- Country: Colombia
- Headquarters: San Andrés, San Andrés and Providencia, Colombia

Statistics
- Area: 52 km^{2} (20 sq mi)
- Population: Total; Catholics: (as of 2024); 61,280; 31,640 (51.6%)
- Parishes: 12

Information
- Denomination: Catholic Church
- Sui iuris church: Latin Church
- Rite: Roman Rite
- Established: 20 June 1912; 114 years ago
- Cathedral: Catedral de La Sagrada Familia
- Secular priests: 9 (6 Diocesan, 3 Religious Orders)

Current leadership
- Pope: Leo XIV
- Vicar Apostolic: Sede vacante
- Apostolic Administrator: Ariel Lascarro Tapia
- Bishops emeritus: Eulises González Sánchez

The Apostolic Vicariate of San Andrés y Providencia (Latin: Apostolicus Vicariatus Sancti Andreae et Providentiae) in the Catholic Church is located in the town of San Andrés, San Andrés y Providencia in Colombia.

== History ==
On 20 June 1912 Pius X established the mission sui iuris of San Andrés y Providencia from the Archdiocese of Cartagena. Pope Pius XII elevated the mission to a Prefecture Apostolic on 14 November 1946. John Paul II elevated it to a Vicariate Apostolic on 5 December 2000.

== Leadership ==
Superiors of Mission "Sui Iuris" of San Andrés y Providencia (Roman Rite)

- James Fitzpatrick (1912 – August 1920), resigned
- Riccardo Turner, M.H.M. (August 1920 – 23 July 1926), resigned
- Eugenio da Carcagente, O.F.M.Cap. (23 July 1926 – 14 November 1946 see below)

Prefects of San Andrés y Providencia (Roman Rite)

- Eugenio da Carcagente, O.F.M.Cap. (see above 14 November 1946 – 8 January 1952), resigned
- Gaspar Pérez Pérez, O.F.M.Cap. (9 January 1953 – 1965)
- Alfonso Robledo de Manizales, O.F.M.Cap. (11 January 1966 – 1972)
- Antonio Ferrándiz Morales, O.F.M.Cap. (24 March 1972 – 10 November 1998)

Apostolic Vicars of San Andrés y Providencia (Roman Rite)

- Eulises González Sánchez (5 December 2000 – 16 April 2016), retired
- Jaime Uriel Sanabria Arias (16 April 2016 – 29 June 2026), appointed Bishop of Yopal
  - Apostolic Administrator Ariel Lascarro Tapia (27 August 2026 – Present), Bishop of Magangué

== See also ==
- Roman Catholicism in Colombia
