= Francisco Ovidio Vera Intriago =

Francisco Ovidio Vera Intriago (October 7, 1941 – April 21, 2014) was a Roman Catholic bishop.

Ordained in 1970 for the Roman Catholic Archdiocese of Portoviejo, Ecuador, Vera Intriago was named auxiliary bishop of the Portoviejo Archdiocese of Portoviejo and titular bishop of Autenti in 1992. He died while still in office.
