= Apostolic Vicariate of Méndez =

Catholic missionary jurisdiction in Ecuador

Apostolic Vicariate of Méndez Apostolicus Vicariatus Mendezensis
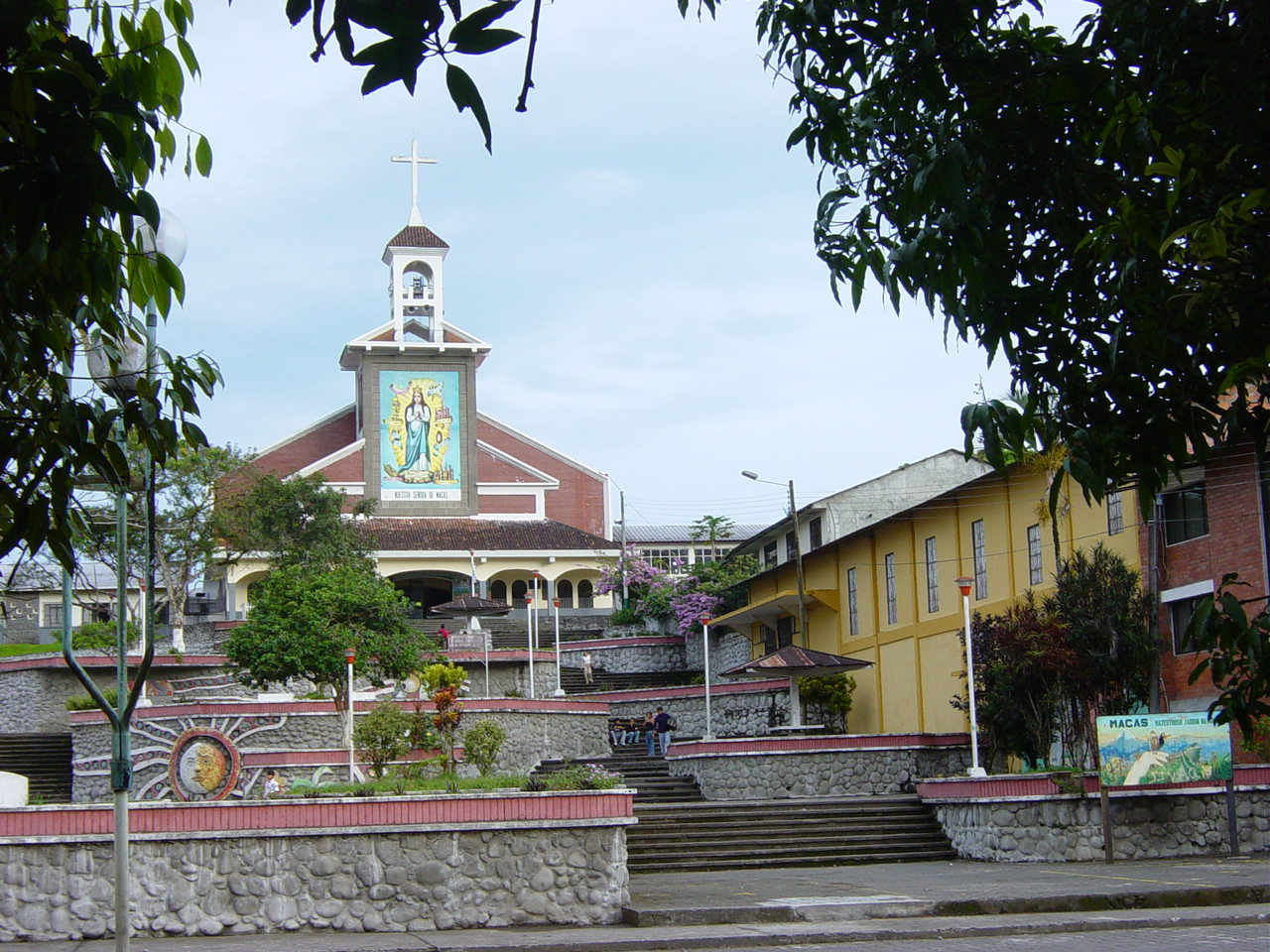
- Cathedral in Macas

Location
- Country: Ecuador

Statistics
- Area: 25,690 km^{2} (9,920 sq mi)
- Population: Total; Catholics: (as of 2010); 126,000; 111,000 (88.1%)
- Parishes: 70

Information
- Denomination: Catholic Church
- Rite: Roman Rite
- Established: 17 February 1893 (132 years ago)
- Cathedral: Catedral Purísima de Macas

Current leadership
- Pope: Leo XIV
- Vicar Apostolic: Néstor Montesdeoca Becerra, S.D.B.

Map
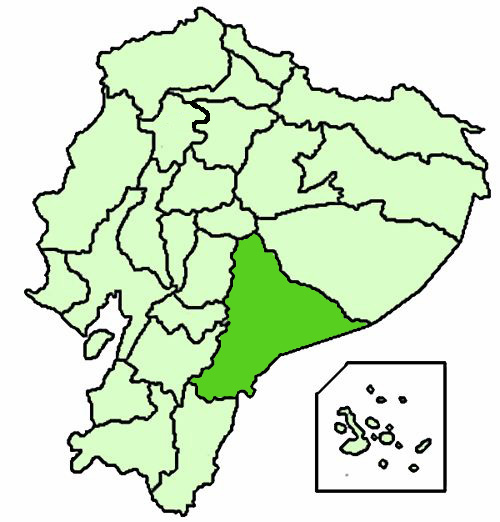

The Apostolic Vicariate (or Vicariate Apostolic) of Méndez (Latin: Apostolicus Vicariatus Mendezensis) is a missionary circonscription of the Roman Catholic Church.

Its cathedral see, Catedral Purísima de Macas, is located in the city of Macas in Ecuador's Morona-Santiago province. It is exempt, i.e. directly subject to the Holy See, not part of any ecclesiastical province.

== History ==
On 17 February 1893 Pope Leo XIII established the Vicariate Apostolic of Méndez y Gualaquiza from the Vicariate Apostolic of Napo.

Pope Pius XII shortened its name to the Vicariate Apostolic of Méndez on 12 April 1951.

== Bishops ==
=== Incumbent ordinaries ===
So far, all its apostolic vicars were members of the missionary Salesians order (S.D.B.)

Apostolic vicars of Méndez y Gualaquiza

- Santiago (Giacomo) Costamagna, S.D.B. † 1921 (18 March 1895 – 1919)
- Domenico Comin, S.D.B. (1920.03.05 – 1951.04.12 cfr. infra

Apostolic vicars of Méndez

- Domenico Comin, S.D.B. (cfr. supra; 1951.04.12 – 1963.08.17)
- José Félix Pintado Blasco, S.D.B. † (17 Aug. 1963 – 24 Jan. 1981)
- Teodoro Luis Arroyo Robelly, S.D.B. † (24 Jan. 1981 – 1 July 1993)
- Pietro Gabrielli, S.D.B. (1 July 1993 – 15 April 2008)
- Néstor Montesdeoca Becerra, S.D.B. (15 Apr 2008 – present)

=== Coadjutor Vicar Apostolic ===
- José Félix Pintado Blasco, S.D.B. † (13 Nov 1958 - 17 Aug. 1963)

== See also ==
- Roman Catholicism in Ecuador
