= Sophie Ley =

German painter (1849–1918)

- Born: 1849; Bodmann am Bodensee, Kingdom of Württemberg
- Died: 1918 (aged 68–69); Karlsruhe, German Empire
- Known for: Painting

Sophie Ley (1849–1918) was a German painter.

Ley was born in 1849 in Bodmann am Bodensee, Kingdom of Württemberg.

She studied painting with Hans Gude and at the Academia Artium Stuttgardens. She also studied with Eugen Bracht at the Academy of Fine Arts, Karlsruhe. Ley exhibited her work at the Woman's Building at the 1893 World's Columbian Exposition in Chicago, Illinois. She was a member of the Stuttgarter Künstlerbund (Stuttgart Artists' Association).

Ley died in 1918 in Karlsruhe.

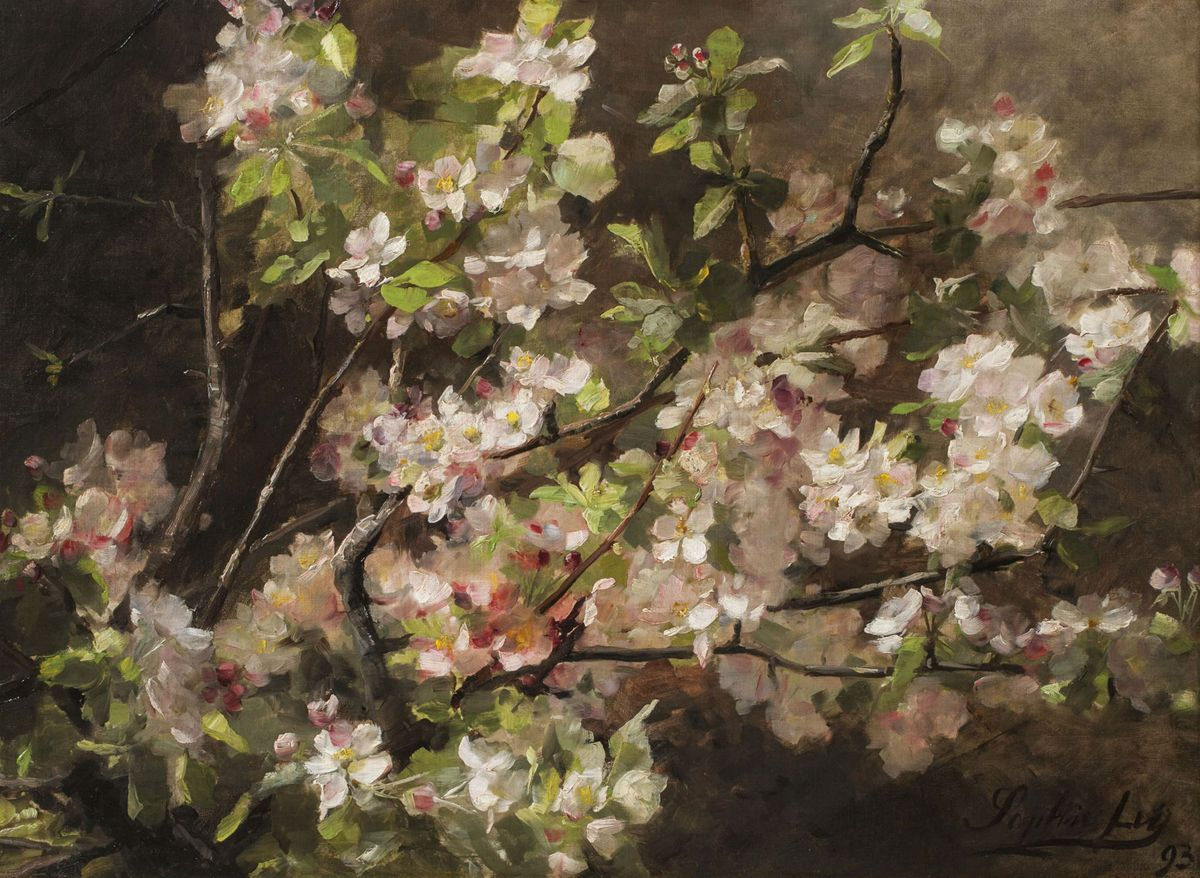
Apple Blossoms by Sophie Ley, 1893
