= Néstor Montesdeoca Becerra =

Ecuadorian prelate (born 1957)

The Most Reverend Néstor Montesdeoca Becerra
- Vicar Apostolic of Méndez
- Church: Roman Catholic Church
- Appointed: April 15, 2008
- Predecessor: Pietro Gabrielli SDB

Orders
- Ordination: August 30, 1986
- Consecration: June 21, 2008 by Giacomo Guido Ottonello

Personal details
- Born: Néstor Montesdeoca Becerra; April 29, 1957 (age 68) El Pan, Ecuador
- Motto: Lux in Tenebris

Néstor Montesdeoca Becerra SDB (El Pan, Azuay Province, April 29, 1957), is an Ecuadorian prelate of the Roman Catholic Church affiliated with the Pia Sociedad de São Francisco de Sales. Currently, he is in charge of the Apostolic Vicariate of Mendez, in Ecuador.

== Biography ==
Néstor was born in El Pan, in the Ecuadorian province of Azuay. After completing his primary studies at the Nicanor Corral School, and his secondary studies at the Colégio Salesiano Orientalista de Cuenca, from 1977 to 1980, he frequented the institutional courses of Philosophy at the Instituto Superior Salesiano, at the time attached to the Pontificia Universidad Católica de Equador (now Salesian Polytechnic University), where he completed his degree in Educational Sciences, specializing in Psychopedagogy.

From 1977 to 1980, he studied theology in Rome, at the Pontifical Salesian University, completing his graduation. He also frequented a PhD course in Theological Sciences and Sacred Scripture at the same institution.

He made perpetual profession in the Salesian Congregation on May 24, 1982, and was ordained a priest on August 30, 1986.

After the ordination, he assumed the following assignments: Professor and Counselor at the Instituto Superior Salesiano in Quito (1986–1988); Counselor at the Colégio Salesiano Card. Spellman (1988–1992); Member of the Salesian Community of Riobamba and Professor of the Santo Tomás College (1992–1993); Pároco da Missão de Limón, in Méndez, and in charge of the Youth Ministry of the Liceu Salesiano (1993–1995); Formator and Vigário of the Salesian Post-novitiate in Quito, Teacher at the Salesian Polytechnic University (1995–2000); Member of the Salesian Community of El Girón and responsible for the Youth Ministry of the Colégio Salesiano Card. Spellman in Quito (2000–2003); Director of the Salesian Community of El Girón in Quito (2003–2006); Director of the Salesian Community of La Tola in Quito; Responsible for Educational Units Card. Spellman and Don Bosco de la Tola and still from the Chicos de la Calle program in Quito (2006–2008).

On April 15, 2008, Pope Benedict XVI appointed Becerra to assume the Apostolic Vicariate of Méndez, substituting to Pietro Gabrielli, SDB, who resigned due to reaching the canonical age limit, handing him over to the titular episcopal see of Celas in Mauritania. His episcopal ordination took place on the following June 21, in the Cathedral of the Most Pure Virgin in Macas, by the then Apostolic Nuncio in Ecuador, Giacomo Guido Ottonello, with Gabrielli, or resigning bishop, and Luis Antonio Sánchez Armijos, bishop of Tulcán, both Salesians, as co-consecrators.

Dom Néstor participated in the beatification ceremony of Irmã Maria Troncatti, FMA, held in the Cathedral of Macas, on November 24, 2012, presided over by Salesian cardinal Angelo Amato, Entente Prefect of the Congregation for the Cause of Saints, as papal delegate. On the occasion, Dom Néstor read, in the name of the local Church, the Salesian request for the registration of Irmã Maria not cast two bem-venturados.
