= Apostolic Vicariate of Sahara =

The Vicariate Apostolic of Sahara (Latin: Vicariatus Apostolicus Saharensis) is a former Roman Catholic missionary jurisdiction in colonial Algeria and Libya.

== History ==
The Sahara is a vast desert of northern Africa, measuring about 932 miles from north to south and 2484 miles from east to west, and dotted with oases which are centres of population. Eight years after the journey of the French explorer Henri Duveyrier (1859–61), which had important scientific results, Pope Pius IX on 6 August 1868 appointed the Archbishop of Algiers, Charles Lavigerie, as delegate Apostolic of the Sahara and the Sudan. In the same year the Jesuits established themselves at Laghouat, the extremity occupied by French arms. In 1871 they sent to Lavigerie a long report in which they advocated the establishment of dispensaries and schools. In 1872, Charmetant and two other White Fathers (Missionary Fathers of Africa of Algiers) replaced the Jesuits at Laghouat. In 1873, the White Fathers established themselves at Biskra, Ouargla, Touggart and Gerryville. Later a station was founded at Melili in M'zab.

Two successive attempts were made by the White Fathers to reach the Sudan region by crossing the Sahara, thus reaching Timbuktu, a large market for black slaves, there to join in the struggle against slavery. The first attempt was made in December, 1878, by Menoret, Paulmier and Bouchand; they were slain in April, 1876 by their Touarag guides, being the first martyrs of the Society of White Fathers, and the cause of their beatification was introduced at Rome in 1909. After this disaster the White Fathers founded two stations, not farther north in the desert, but to the north-east, at Tripoli and Ghadames, both in Libya. The massacre of the explorer Flatters and his companions (1880–81) did not discourage the White Fathers in their second attempt to cross the Sahara. In 1881, Richard set out from Ghadames, having become so Arabian in speech and bearing that no one suspected his nationality. He intended to establish himself with Morat and Pouplard at Ghat in the midst of the Libyan desert, but all three were assassinated.

The White Fathers then left Ghadames. On 25 March 1890, while the Brussels conference against slavery was being held, Lavigerie explained in a letter to Keller that to eradicate in Africa the great Muslim corporation of the Senussi, which protected the slave-trade, the Sahara must be crossed, and he announced the opening at Biskra in Algeria, at the entrance to the Sahara, of a so-called House of God, intended for the formation of the "Brothers of the Sahara" or "Pioneers of the Sahara", who would engage in charitable works and in extending hospitality to travelers, the sick and fugitive slaves. The Pioneers of the Sahara had to live as religious, but without monastic vows. As early as February, 1891, the station at Ouargla, also in northern Algeria, suppressed in 1876, was re-established, and in October Harquard sent thither six armed "pioneers" who wrote to the cardinal: "We shall endeavor to hold high the banner of the Sacred Heart and the flag of France." The White Sisters founded hospitals at Ghardaïa and El Tbiod Sidi Cheikh, thus gaining the confidence of populations which were hostile to France.

The Fourean-Lamy expedition of 1898, which succeeded in crossing the desert as far as Lake Chad, opened wider avenues to the Catholic apostolate. The Prefecture Apostolic of the Sahara and the Sudan became a Vicariate Apostolic on 6 March 1891, and in 1901 received new boundaries by which the Prefecture Apostolic of Ghardaïa was separated from it. The twentieth degree of latitude forms the boundary between them.

In the early 20th century, the vicariate, with an estimated total population of 4,000,000, governed 1000 European Catholics, 600 black Catholics, 4000 catechumens, 40 missionaries, 15 sisters and 35 catechists; it had 12 churches or chapels, 10 schools, 7 orphanages, 3 leper houses and 2 hospitals.

== See also ==
- Catholic Church in Algeria
- Catholic Church in Libya
