= Raúl López Mayorga =

Equadorian Roman Catholic bishop (born 1926)

The Most Reverend Raúl Holguer López Mayorga
- Bishop Emeritus of Latacunga
- Church: Roman Catholic Church
- Diocese: Latacunga
- Appointed: 18 June 1990
- Term ended: 19 February 2003
- Predecessor: José Mario Ruiz Navas
- Successor: Víctor Naranjo Tovar

Orders
- Ordination: 29 June 1951
- Consecration: 29 April 1973 by Vicente Cisneros Durán

Personal details
- Born: Raúl Holguer López Mayorga; 24 August 1926 (age 99) Mocha, Tungurahua Province, Ecuador

Raúl Holguer López Mayorga (born 24 August 1926) is an Ecuadorian Roman Catholic prelate who served as the bishop of Latacunga from 1990 to 2003. He previously served as Auxiliary Bishop, Coadjutor Bishop and Bishop of Guaranda.

== Early life and priesthood ==
Raúl Holguer López Mayorga was born on 24 August 1926 in Mocha, in Ecuador’s Tungurahua Province. He was ordained a priest on 29 June 1951.

== Episcopal ministry ==
López Mayorga was appointed Titular Bishop of Casae in Numidia and Auxiliary Bishop of Guaranda on 30 March 1973 and received episcopal consecration on 29 April 1973, with Bishop Vicente Cisneros Durán as principal consecrator. He later served as Coadjutor Bishop of Guaranda, succeeding as Bishop of Guaranda in 1980.

In June 1990, López Mayorga was appointed Bishop of Latacunga, where he led the diocese for more than a decade.

== Retirement ==
On 19 February 2003, Pope John Paul II accepted López Mayorga’s resignation from the pastoral governance of the Diocese of Latacunga in accordance with canon law and appointed his successor, Víctor Naranjo Tovar.
