= Gonzalo López Marañon =

Ecuadorian priest and theologian (1933–2016)

Gonzalo López Marañon OCD
- Vicar Apostolic of San Miguel de Sucumbíos
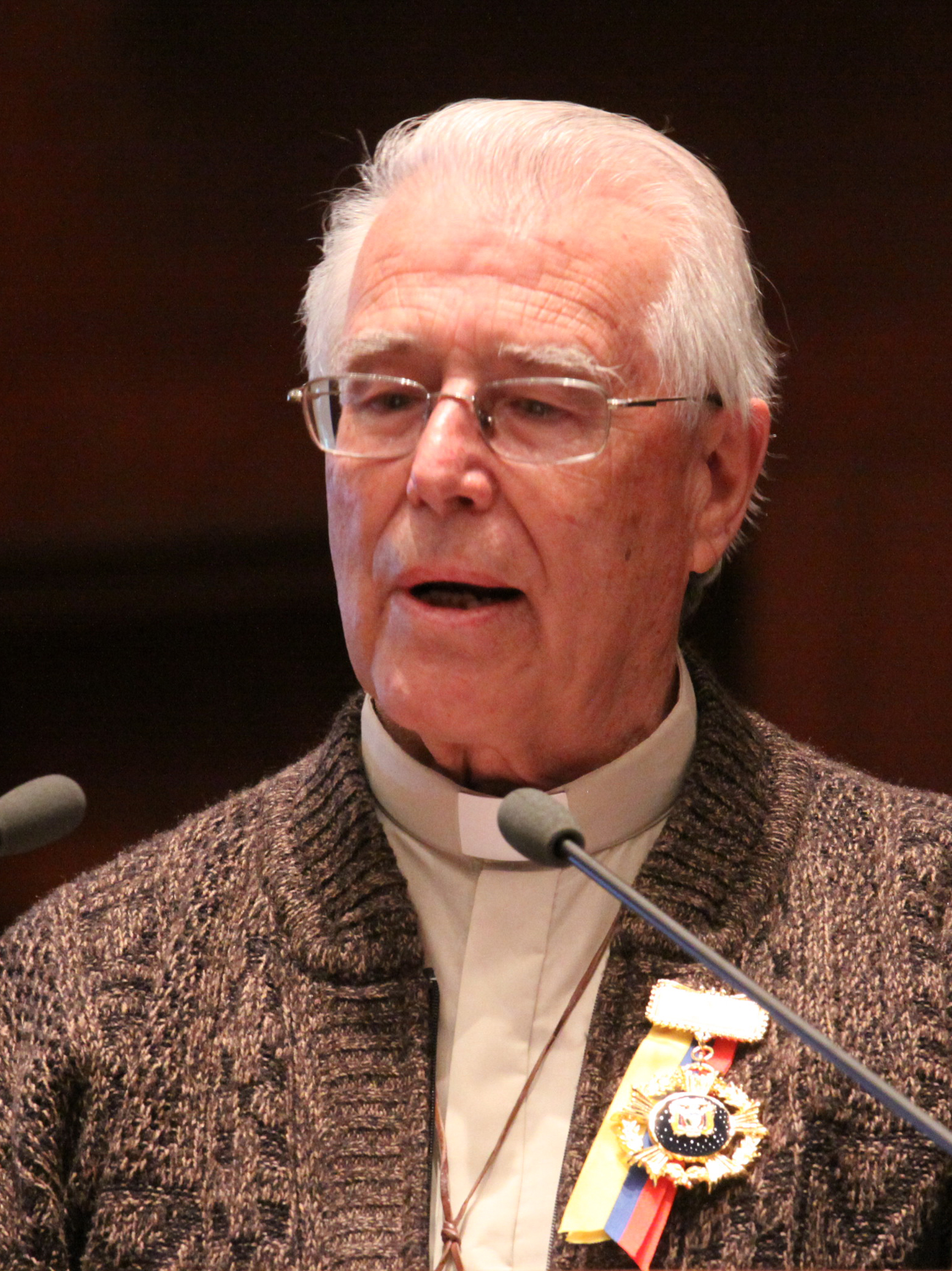
- Marañón in 2011
- Church: Catholic Church
- See: Apostolic Vicariate of San Miguel de Sucumbíos
- In office: 26 June 1970 – 30 October 2010
- Predecessor: Wenceslao Manuel Gomez Frande
- Successor: Celmo Lazzari
- Other post: Titular Bishop of Seleuciana (1984-2016)

Orders
- Ordination: 6 April 1957
- Consecration: 8 December 1984 by Luis Alberto Luna Tobar

Personal details
- Born: 3 October 1933 Medina de Pomar, Province of Burgos, Spanish Republic
- Died: 7 May 2016 (aged 82)

Gonzalo López Marañón (3 October 1933 – 7 May 2016) was an Ecuadorian Roman Catholic bishop.

Ordained to the priesthood in 1957, López Marañón served as bishop of the Apostolic Vicariate of San Miguel de Sucumbíos, Ecuador from 1984 until 2010.
