= Apostolic Vicariate of Leticia =

Catholic missionary jurisdiction in Colombia

Apostolic Vicariate of Leticia Apostolicus Vicariatus Laetitiae

Location
- Country: Colombia

Statistics
- Area: 109,665 km^{2} (42,342 sq mi)
- Population: Total; Catholics: (as of 2010); 77,500; 69,900 (90.2%)
- Parishes: 12

Information
- Denomination: Catholic Church
- Rite: Roman Rite
- Established: 8 February 1951 (75 years ago)
- Cathedral: Catedral de Nuestra Señora de La Paz

Current leadership
- Pope: Leo XIV
- Vicar Apostolic: John Mario Mesa Palacio
- Bishops emeritus: José de Jesús Quintero Díaz

Map

The Apostolic Vicariate of Leticia (Latin: Apostolicus Vicariatus Laetitiae) in the Catholic Church is located in the city of Leticia, Amazonas, in Colombia.

== History ==
On 8 February 1951 Pope Pius XII established the Prefecture Apostolic of Leticia from the Vicariate Apostolic of Caquetá. Blessed John Paul II elevated it to a Vicariate Apostolic on 23 October 2000.

== Ordinaries ==
- Marceliano Eduardo Canyes Santacana, O.F.M. Cap. † (11 Jan 1952 – 4 Mar 1989) Resigned
- Alfonso Yepes Rojo † (4 Mar 1989 – 21 May 1990) Died
  - Sede vacante (21 May 1990 – 8 Jul 1997)
- William de Jesús Ruiz Velásquez (8 Jul 1997 – 23 Oct 2000) Resigned
- José de Jesús Quintero Díaz (23 Oct 2000 – 4 Dec 2025) Retired
- John Mario Mesa Palacio (4 Dec 2025 – Present)

== See also ==
- Roman Catholicism in Colombia
