= Apostolic Vicariate of Aguarico =

Catholic missionary jurisdiction in Ecuador

Apostolic Vicariate of Aguarico Apostolicus Vicariatus Aguaricoënsis

Location
- Country: Ecuador
- Coordinates: 0.4703°S 76.9803°W

Statistics
- Area: 28,000 km^{2} (11,000 sq mi)
- Population: Total; Catholics: (as of 2010); 133,900; 111,000 (82.9%)
- Parishes: 12

Information
- Denomination: Catholic Church
- Rite: Roman Rite
- Established: 16 November 1953 (72 years ago)
- Cathedral: Catedral Nuestra Señora del Carmen

Current leadership
- Pope: Leo XIV
- Vicar Apostolic: José Adalberto Jiménez Mendoza, OFMCap
- Bishops emeritus: Jesús Esteban Sádaba Pérez, OFMCap.

Map
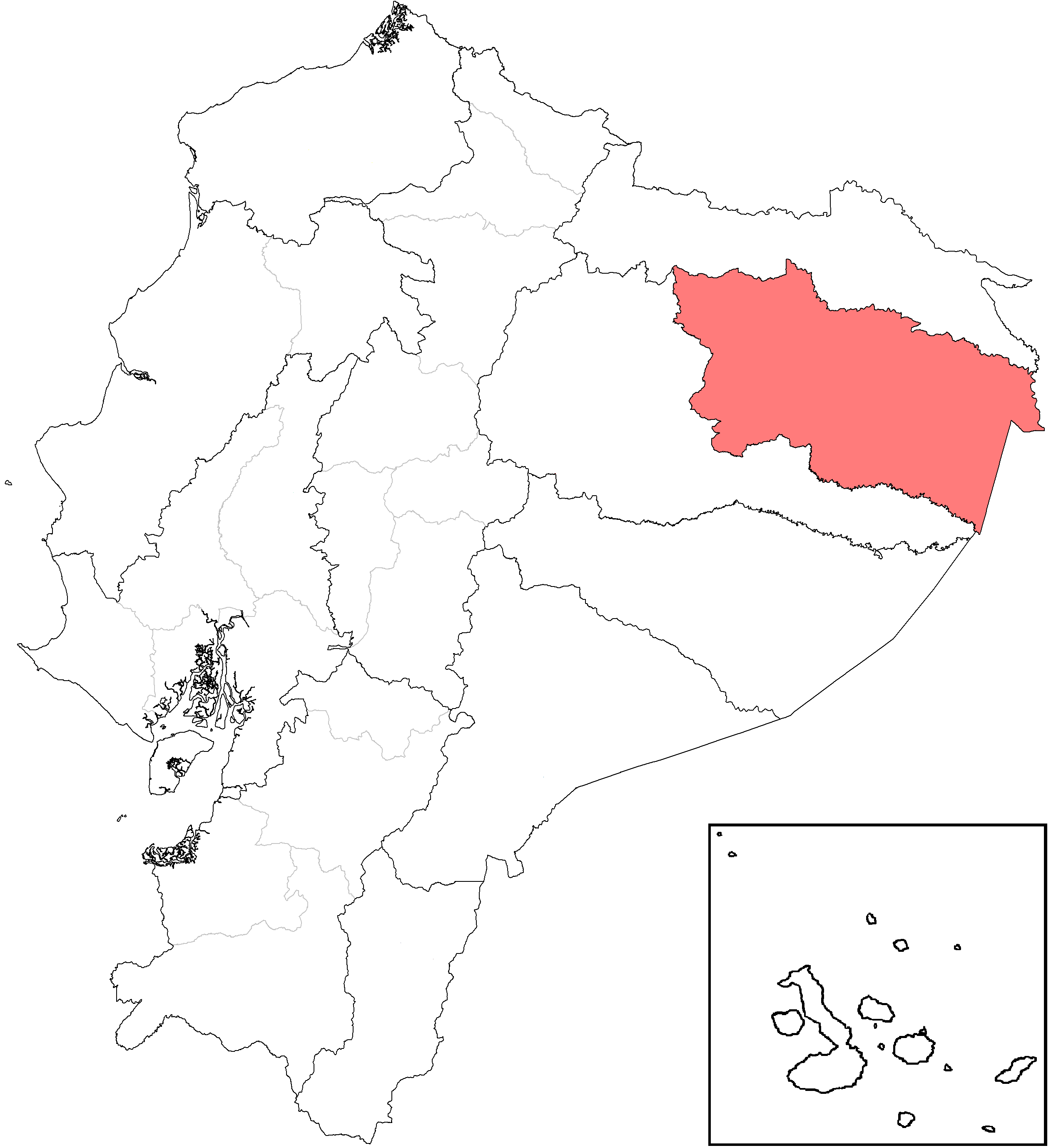

The Apostolic Vicariate (Vicariate Apostolic) of Aguarico (Latin: Apostolicus Vicariatus Aguaricoënsis), a missionary s-circonscription of the Roman Catholic Church, is located in the Aguarico Canton in Ecuador's Amazon rainforest.

== History ==
On 16 November 1953 Pope Pius XII established the Apostolic prefecture of Aguarico from the Apostolic Vicariate of Napo. It has a cathedral see, the Catedral Nuestra Señora del Carmen, in Puerto Francisco de Orellana, in Orellana Province.

Pope John Paul II elevated it to a Apostolic vicariate on 2 July 1984.

It remains exempt, i.e., immediately subject to the Holy See, not part of any ecclesiastical province.

== Episcopal Incumbents ==
So far, all ordinaries have been Capuchins.

Apostolic prefects

- Igino Gamboa, OFMCap † (30 March 1954 Appointed – 1965)
- Alejandro Labaca Ugarte, OFMCap † (22 Jan. 1965 Appointed – 26 June 1970)
- Jesús Langarica Olagüe, OFMCap † (26 June 1970 Appointed – 1982)

Apostolic vicars

- Alejandro Labaca Ugarte, OFMCap † (2 July 1984 Appointed – 2 July 1987)
- Jesús Esteban Sádaba Pérez, OFMCap (22 Jan. 1990 – 2 Aug 2017)
- José Adalberto Jiménez Mendoza, OFMCap (2 Aug 2017 - )

== See also ==
- Roman Catholicism in Ecuador
