= Apostolic Vicariate of Napo =

Catholic missionary jurisdiction in Ecuador

Apostolic Vicariate of Napo Apostolicus Vicariatus Napensis

Location
- Country: Ecuador

Statistics
- Area: 24,600 km^{2} (9,500 sq mi)
- Population: Total; Catholics: (as of 2010); 111,000; 97,000 (87.4%)
- Parishes: 20

Information
- Denomination: Catholic Church
- Rite: Roman Rite
- Established: 7 February 1871 (155 years ago)
- Cathedral: Catedral San José

Current leadership
- Pope: Leo XIV
- Vicar Apostolic: Celmo Lazzari, C.S.I.
- Bishops emeritus: Adelio Pasqualotto, C.S.I.

Map
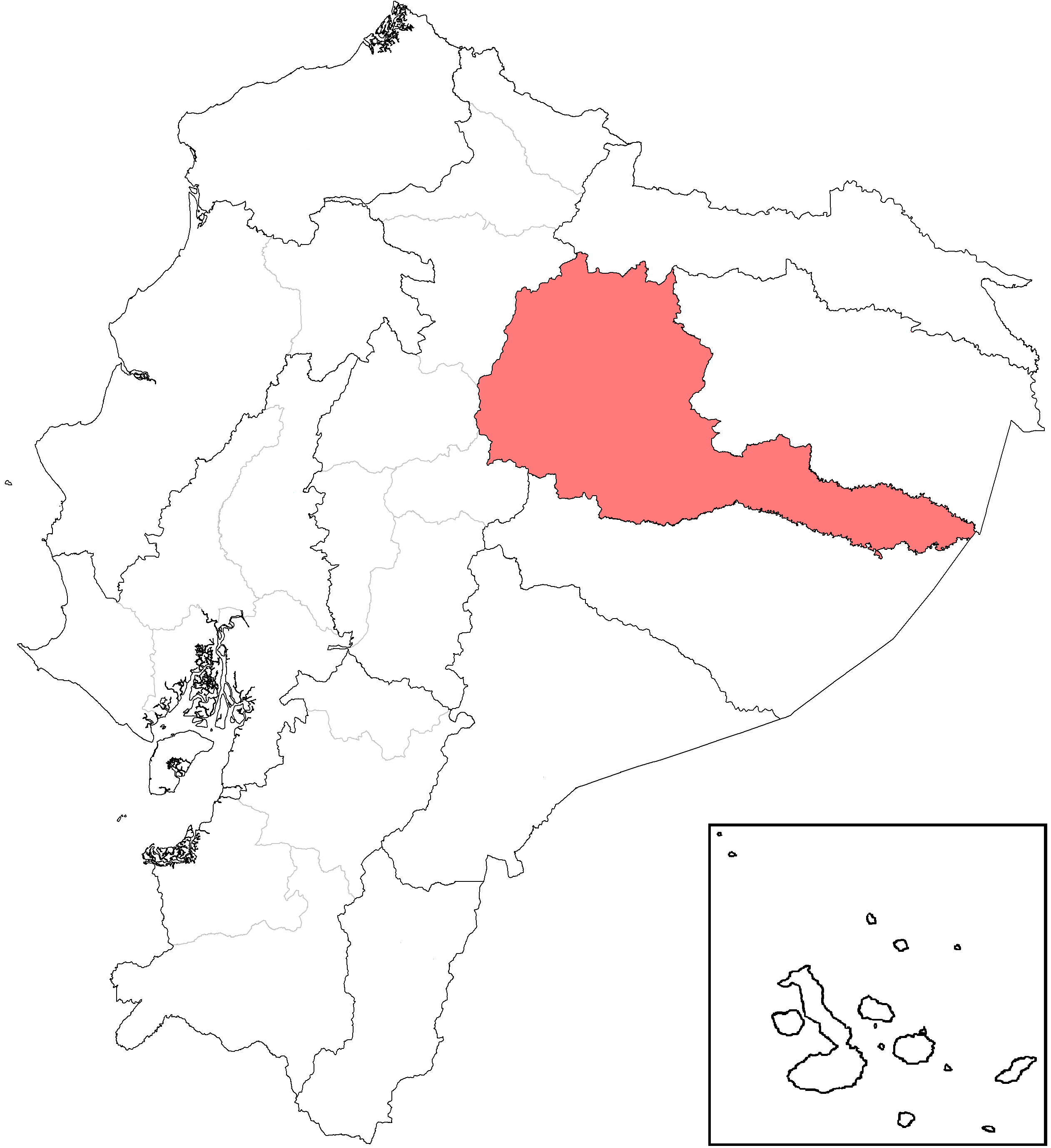

The Apostolic Vicariate (Vicariate Apostolic) of Napo (Latin: Apostolicus Vicariatus Napensis) is a missionary circumscription (quasi-diocese) of the Roman Catholic Church. Its cathedral see, Catedral San José, is located in the city of Tena, capital of Napo Province in Ecuador's Amazon rainforest.

== History ==
On 7 February 1871, Pope Pius IX established the Vicariate Apostolic of Napo from the Archdiocese of Quito. It remains exempt, i.e. directly subject to the Holy See, not part of any ecclesiastical province.

It has lost territory five times with the creation of the following jurisdictions within Ecuador:

- Apostolic Prefecture of Canelos e Macas (1886; meanwhile a Vicariate Apostolic)
- Apostolic Vicariate of Méndez (1893, as Méndez y Gualaquiza)
- Vicariate Apostolic of Zamora (1893)
- Apostolic Prefecture of San Miguel de Sucumbíos (1924; meanwhile an Apostolic Vicariate)
- Apostolic Prefecture of Aguarico (1953; meanwhile an Apostolic Vicariate).

== Leadership ==
Vicars Apostolic

- Andrés Justo Pérez, S.J. (1896 – 1917)
  - Apostolic Administrator Emilio Cecco, C.S.I. (12 November 1921 – 28 April 1931)
- Emilio Cecco, C.S.I. (28 April 1931 – 1938), resigned
- Giorgio Rossi, C.S.I. (23 May 1938 – 22 January 1941)
- Maximiliano Spiller, C.S.I. (12 November 1941 – 27 April 1978), retired
- Julio Parise Loro, C.S.I. (27 April 1978 – 2 August 1996), retired
- Paolo Mietto, C.S.I. (2 August 1996 – 11 June 2010), retired
- Celmo Lazzari, C.S.I. (11 June 2010 – 21 November 2013), appointed Vicar Apostolic of San Miguel de Sucumbíos
- Adelio Pasqualotto, C.S.I. (12 December 2014 – 31 May 2023), resigned
  - Apostolic Administrator Jesús Esteban Sádaba, O.F.M. Cap. (31 May 2023 – 7 January 2025)
- Celmo Lazzari, C.S.I. (23 October 2024 – Present)

Coadjutor Vicar Apostolic

- Paolo Mietto, C.S.I. (1 July 1994 - 2 August 1996)

Auxiliary bishops

- Antonio Cabri, C.S.I. (9 May 1974 to 27 July 1974), died without being consecrated
- Julio Parise Loro, C.S.I. (5 October 1974 - 27 April 1978), appointed Vicar Apostolic here

== See also ==
- Roman Catholicism in Ecuador
