= Archdiocese of Portoviejo =

Roman Catholic archdiocese in Ecuador

Coordinates: 1.0522°S 80.4539°W

Archdiocese of Portoviejo Archidioecesis Portus Veteris

Catholic

Location
- Country: Ecuador
- Ecclesiastical province: Porto Viejo

Statistics
- Area: 20,342 km^{2} (7,854 sq mi)
- Population: Total; Catholics: (as of 2004); 1,186,025; 1,091,143 (92%)
- Parishes: 78

Information
- Denomination: Roman Catholic
- Rite: Latin Rite
- Established: 23 March 1870 (Erected as a Diocese); 25 February 1994 (Elevated to Archdiocese)
- Cathedral: Cathedral of Jesús del Buen Pastor

Current leadership
- Pope: Leo XIV
- Archbishop: Eduardo José Castillo Pino
- Auxiliary Bishops: Vicente Horacio Saeteros Sierra
- Bishops emeritus: Lorenzo Voltolini Esti Archbishop Emeritus

Map
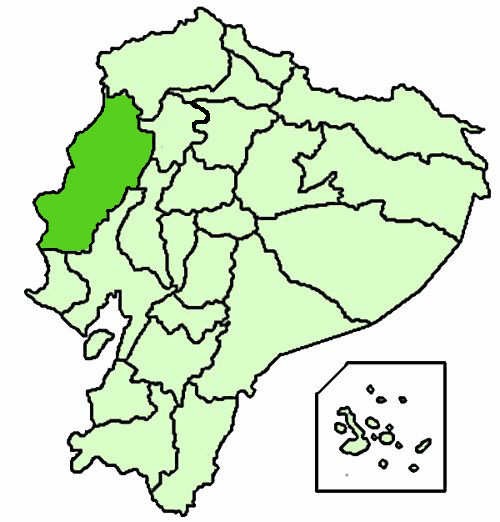

Website
- arquidiocesisportoviejo.org

The Roman Catholic Metropolitan Archdiocese of Portoviejo (Latin: Archidioecesis Portus Veteris) is an archdiocese located in the city of Portoviejo in Ecuador.

== Special churches ==
- Minor Basilicas:
  - Basílica de Santísima Virgen de Monserrat in Montecristi
    (Basilica of the Holy Virgin of Montserrat)

== Bishops ==
=== Ordinaries ===
Bishops of Portoviejo

- Luis Tola y Avilés (6 Mar 1871 – 1881)
- Pedro Schumacher, C.M. (27 Mar 1885 – 15 Jul 1900)
- Juan María Riera, O.P. (16 Dec 1907 – 19 Jan 1912), appointed Bishop of Guayaquil
- Nicanor Carlos Gavinales Chamorro (30 May 1947 – 17 Feb 1967)
- Luis Alfredo Carvajal Rosales (17 Feb 1967 – 6 Aug 1989)
- José Mario Ruiz Navas (6 Aug 1989 – 25 February 1994)

Archbishops of Portoviejo

- José Mario Ruiz Navas (25 February 1994 – 6 Aug 2007)
- Lorenzo Voltolini Esti (6 Aug 2007 – 14 Sept 2018)
- Eduardo José Castillo Pino (2 Oct 2019–present)

=== Coadjutor bishop ===
- Luis Alfredo Carvajal Rosales (1963-1967)

=== Auxiliary bishops ===
- Luis Alfredo Carvajal Rosales (1955-1963), appointed Coadjutor here
- Francisco Ovidio Vera Intriago (1992-2014)
- Lorenzo Voltolini Esti (1993-2007), appointed Archbishop here
- Eduardo José Castillo Pino (2012-2019), appointed Archbishop here
- Vicente Horacio Saeteros Sierra (2020-

== Suffragan dioceses ==
- Diocese of Santo Domingo in Ecuador

== See also ==
- Roman Catholicism in Ecuador

== Sources ==
- GCatholic.org
- Catholic Hierarchy
- Diocese website
