= Oued Oum el Hallalif =

River in Tunisia

Coordinates: 36°56′33″N 10°48′53″E

The Oued Oum el Hallalif is a river on Cape Bon, Tunisia. It is located at 36° 56' 33" N, 10° 48' 53" E.
