= Diocese of Latacunga =

Roman Catholic diocese in Ecuador

Diocese of Latacunga Dioecesis Latacungensis

Catholic
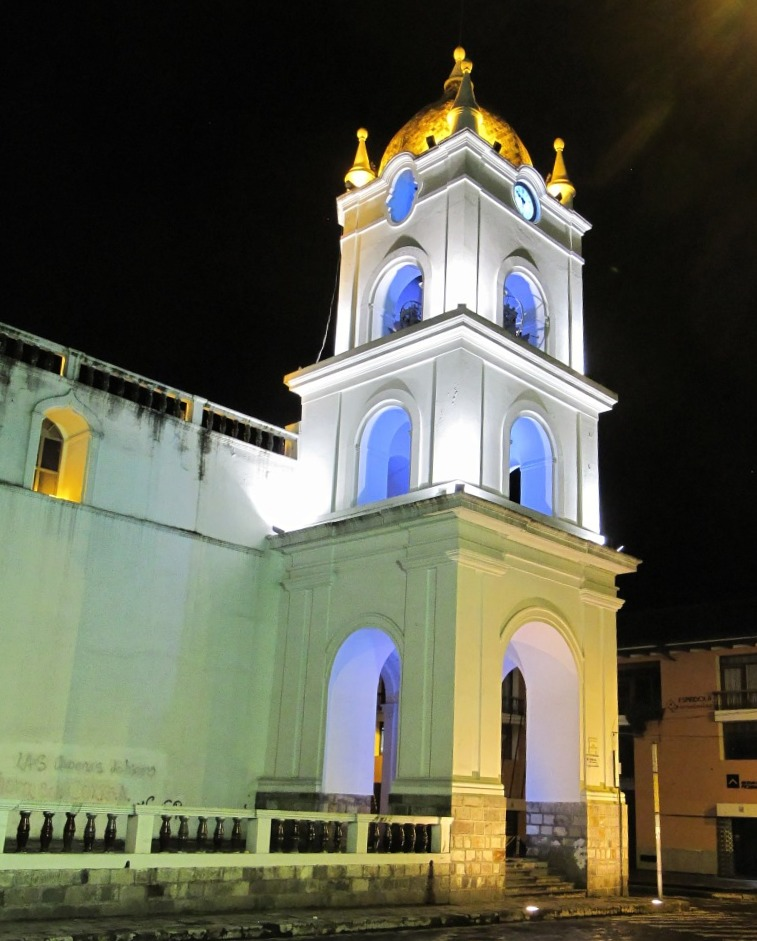
- Catedral de Latacunga

Location
- Country: Ecuador
- Ecclesiastical province: Quito
- Coordinates: 0°56′S 78°37′W

Statistics
- Area: 5,093 km^{2} (1,966 sq mi)
- Population: Total; Catholics: (as of 2004); 351,000; 300,000 (85.5%)
- Parishes: 40

Information
- Denomination: Roman Catholic
- Rite: Latin Rite
- Established: 5 December 1963 (62 years ago)
- Cathedral: Catedral San Jose

Current leadership
- Pope: Leo XIV
- Bishop: Geovanni Mauricio Paz Hurtado
- Bishops emeritus: Raúl Holguer López Mayorga; José Victoriano Naranjo Tovar

Map
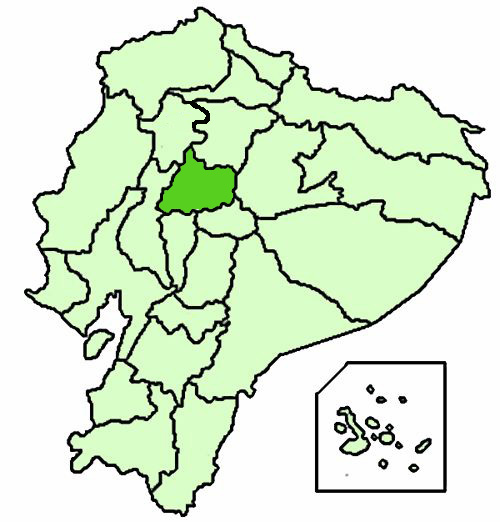

The Roman Catholic Diocese of Latacunga (Latin: Dioecesis Latacungensis) is a diocese located in the city of Latacunga in the ecclesiastical province of Quito in Ecuador.

== Bishops ==
=== Ordinaries ===
- Benigno Chiriboga, S.J. (5 Dec 1963 – 3 Dec 1968)
- José Mario Ruiz Navas (5 Dec 1968 – 6 Aug 1989), appointed Bishop of Portoviejo (Porto Vecchio)
- Raúl Holguer López Mayorga (18 Jun 1990 – 19 Feb 2003)
- José Victoriano Naranjo Tovar (19 Feb 2003 – 30 Nov 2016)
- Geovanni Mauricio Paz Hurtado (30 Nov 2016–present)

=== Other priest of this diocese who became bishop ===
- Wilson Abraham Moncayo Jalil, appointed Bishop of Santo Domingo de los Colorados in 2002

== Sources ==
- GCatholic.org
- Catholic Hierarchy
