= Military Ordinariate of Ecuador =

Catholic ecclesiastical jurisdiction in Ecuador

Military Ordinariate of Ecuador Ordinariatus Militaris Aequatorianae Reipublicae Obispado Castrense del Ecuador
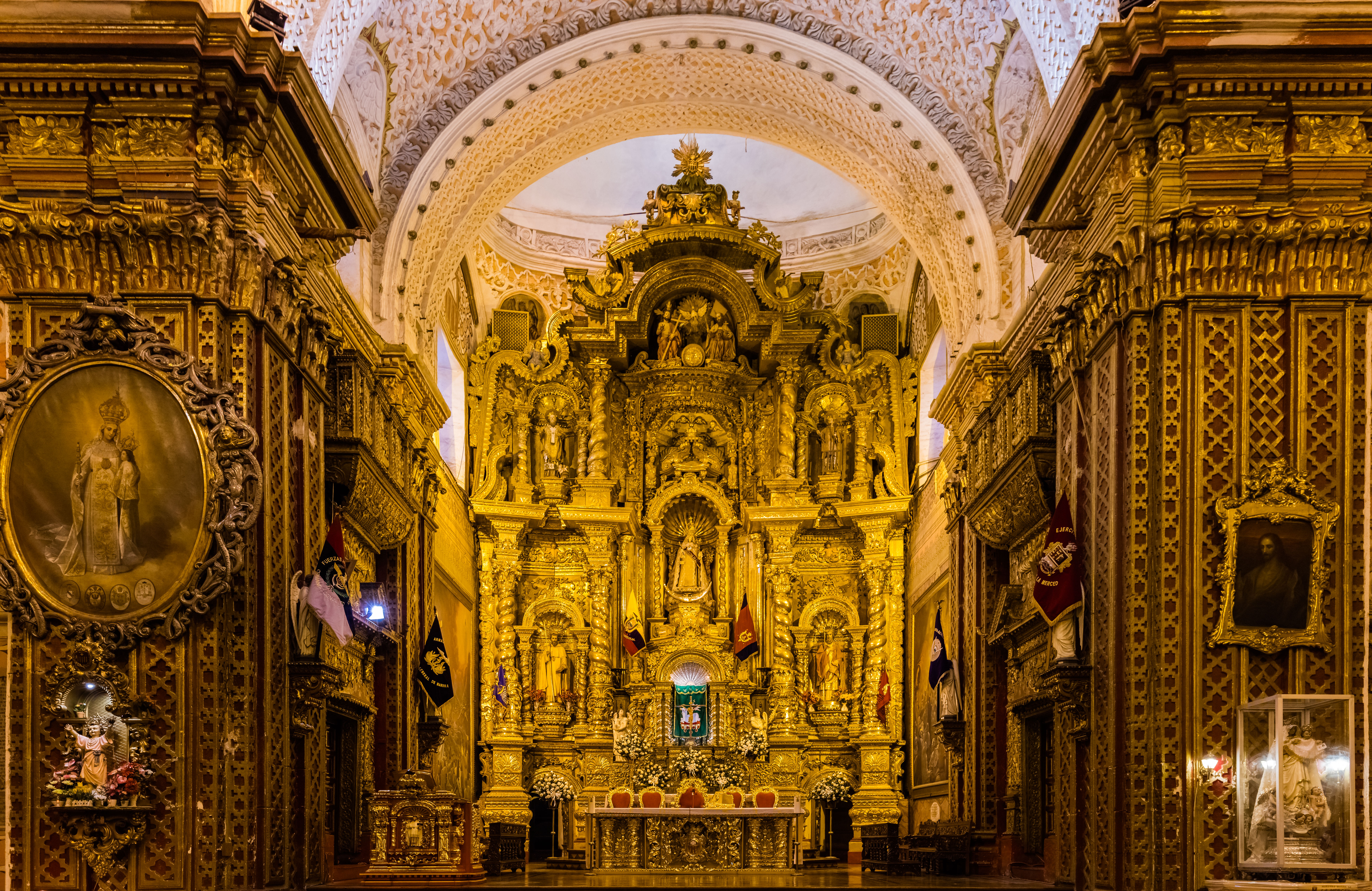

Location
- Country: Ecuador
- Headquarters: Quito, Ecuador

Statistics
- Parishes: 4

Information
- Denomination: Catholic Church
- Sui iuris church: Latin Church
- Rite: Roman Rite
- Established: 30 March 1983; 43 years ago
- Cathedral: Basilica of La Merced, Quito
- Secular priests: 78 (40 Diocesan, 38 Religious Orders)

Current leadership
- Pope: Leo XIV
- Bishop: José Asimbaya

The Military Ordinariate of Ecuador (Spanish: Obispado Castrense del Ecuador) is a Latin Church military ordinariate of the Catholic Church in Ecuador. It is immediately exempt to the Holy See and its Roman Congregation for Bishops. It is headquartered at Apartado 17-03-758, Av. América 1830 y Mercadillo in Quito, the capital of Ecuador. It provides pastoral care to Catholics serving in the Ecuadorian Armed Forces and their families.

== Statistics ==
As of 2023, the ordinariate had 118 missions with 78 priests (40 diocesan, 38 religious) and 38 lay religious (brothers).

== History ==
It was established as Military vicariate of Ecuador on 30 March 1983, with the first military vicar appointment on 5 August 1983.

It was elevated to Military ordinariate on 21 July 1986, the incumbent accordingly promoted.

== Ordinaries ==
(all Roman Rite)

Military Vicar of Ecuador

- Juan Ignacio Larrea Holguín (5 August 1983 – 21 July 1986 see below)

Military Ordinaries of Ecuador

- Juan Ignacio Larrea Holguín (see above 21 July 1986 – July 1989), resigned
- Raúl Eduardo Vela Chiriboga (8 July 1989 – 21 March 2003), appointed Archbishop of Quito
- Miguel Ángel Aguilar Miranda (14 February 2004 – 18 June 2014), retired
- René Coba Galarza (18 June 2014 – 12 December 2019), appointed Bishop of Ibarra
- José Asimbaya (31 January 2023 – Present)

== See also ==
- List of Catholic dioceses in Honduras

== Sources and external links ==
- GCatholic - Obispado Castrense del Ecuador with incumbent bio links
- Military Ordinariate of Ecuador (Catholic-Hierarchy)
