= Miguel Zerolo Aguilar =

Canarian politician

Miguel Zerolo Aguilar (born February 26, 1957, Santa Cruz de Tenerife) is a Canarian politician. He became a member of Unión de Centro Democrático (UCD - Central Democratic Union) in 1979, and subsequently transferred to Agrupación Tinerfeña de Independientes (ATI) in 1993.

In 1987 he became a district councilman. In 1990, he took charge of the Canary Island's Tourism and Transportation, after the Canarian Coalition won the autonomous elections. Since 1995, he has served as mayor of Santa Cruz de Tenerife.

In 2017 he was sentenced to seven years in prison for a case of urban corruption known as "Caso Las Teresitas". Finally, on April 1, 2019, Miguel Zerolo Aguilar entered prison.
