= Apostolic Prefecture of Kwango =

The Roman Catholic Apostolic Prefecture (or Prefecture Apostolic) of Kwango was a mission territory in Central Africa set up at the end of the nineteenth century.

== History ==
The Kwango River flows into the Kassai River, which itself is a tributary of the River Congo. This mission (Missio Kwangensis) formed a part of the Apostolic Vicariate of Belgian Congo till April, 1892, when a papal decree was issued, entrusting this new mission to the Jesuit Fathers of the order's Belgian province.

Emile van Hencxthoven (1852–1906) was its first superior. He left Belgium on 6 March 1893 with two priests, one scholastic, and two lay brothers, and reached the mission towards the end of May. One of the priests died on the way. By decree of 30 January 1903, the Kwango mission was made a prefecture Apostolic (Præfectura Apostolica Kwangensis), the first prefect Apostolic being Father Julian Banckaert, with residence at Kisantu, the chief mission station.

The prefecture comprised the civil districts of Eastern Kwango and that of Stanley Pool as far to the north as the River Kassai. It was located between 4° to 8° S. latitude and 15° to 20° E. longitude. Its boundaries were to the north the river Kassai, to the east the range of hills between the Rivers Loange and D'Juma; to the south Portuguese territory; to the west the River Inkisi and the railway to Leopoldville.

The sisters of Notre Dame de Namur had educational institutions for girls at Kisantu and Lemfu.

Jesuit father Julian Banckaert was born at Bruges (Belgium) in 1847, entered the diocesan seminary, and was ordained in 1871. He joined the Society of Jesus in 1875 and was sent to Bengal in 1878. There he was successively a missionary, superior of the mission, and military chaplain until, in 1901, he was sent to the Kwango mission.

In 1931 it became the Apostolic Vicariate of Kisantu, and later, in 1959, the diocese of Kisantu.
