= Emilio Lorenzo Stehle =

German cleric and Catholic bishop in Ecuador

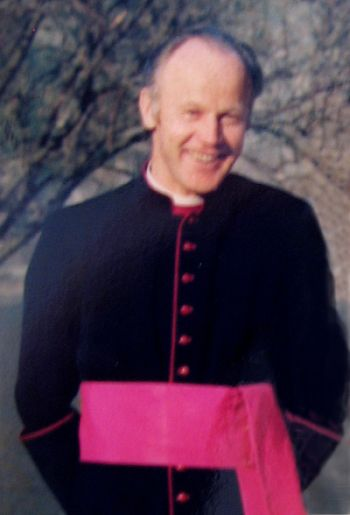
Emil Stehle, 1977

Emilio Lorenzo Stehle (September 9, 1926 – May 16, 2017) was a German cleric who served as a Catholic bishop in Ecuador.

Born in Germany, Stehle was ordained to the priesthood in 1951. Stehle served as auxiliary bishop of the Roman Catholic Archdiocese of Quito, Ecuador, from 1983 to 1986. He then served as bishop of the Roman Catholic Diocese of Santo Domingo de los Colorados from 1987 to 2002.

Stehle died on May 16, 2017.

When journalistic investigations revealed in 2021 that Stehle had used the office to facilitate the escape of priests accused of abusing minors, the Roman Catholic Diocese of Hildesheim commissioned an investigation. Moreover, allegations of abuse against Stehle himself have shocked Germany. Stehle also allegedly facilitated the transfer of accused priests from Germany to Latin America.
