= Wilson Abraham Moncayo Jalil =

Wilson Abraham Moncayo Jalil (September 20, 1944 in Ambato, Ecuador – March 12, 2012) was the Roman Catholic bishop of the Roman Catholic Diocese of Santo Domingo en Ecuador, Ecuador.

Ordained to the priesthood in 1970, Moncayo Jalil was named bishop in 2002. He died in office.
