= Apostolic Vicariate of Puyo =

Catholic missionary jurisdiction in Ecuador

Apostolic Vicariate of Puyo Apostolicus Vicariatus Puyoënsis

Location
- Country: Ecuador

Statistics
- Area: 31,000 km^{2} (12,000 sq mi)
- Population: Total; Catholics: (as of 2010); 67,800; 61,100 (90.1%)
- Parishes: 23

Information
- Denomination: Catholic Church
- Rite: Roman Rite
- Established: 4 October 1886 (138 years ago)
- Cathedral: Catedral Nuestra Señora del Rosario

Current leadership
- Pope: Francis
- Vicar Apostolic: Rafael Cob García
- Bishops emeritus: Frumencio Escudero Arenas

Map
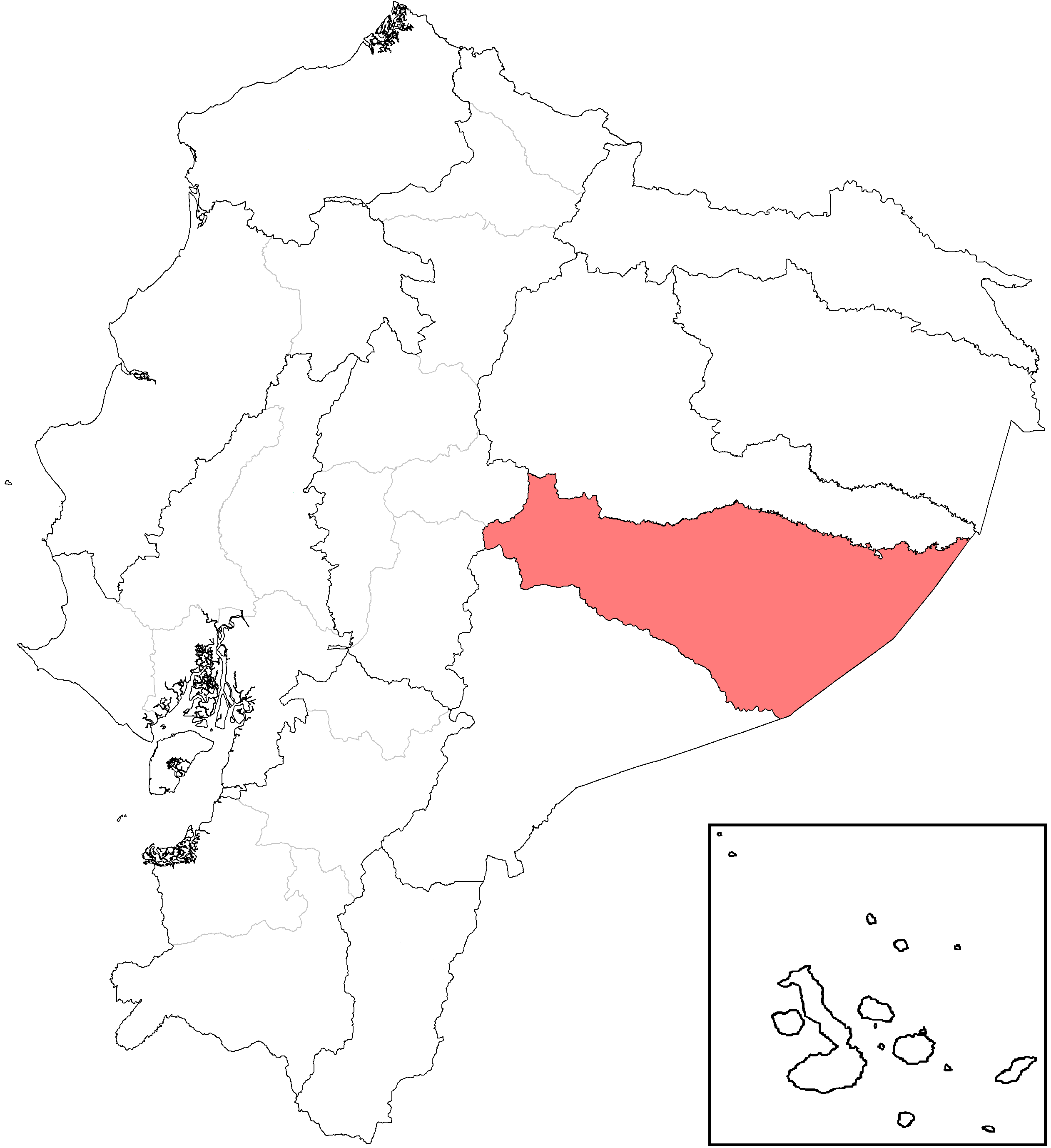

The Apostolic Vicariate (Vicariate Apostolic) of Puyo (Latin: Apostolicus Vicariatus Puyoënsis) is an Apostolic Vicariate (missionary pre-diocesan circumscription) of the Roman Catholic Church. It has a cathedral see, the Catedral Nuestra Señora del Rosario, located in the city of Puyo, capital of Pastaza Province in Ecuador's Amazon rainforest.

== History ==
On 4 October 1886, Pope Leo XIII established the Prefecture Apostolic of Canelos y Macas from the Vicariate Apostolic of Napo. Its name was changed to the Apostolic Prefecture of Canelos by Pope Pius XI on 19 February 1930.

The prefecture was elevated to the status of Vicariate Apostolic of Canelos by Pope Paul VI on 29 September 1964. Its name was changed to the Vicariate Apostolic of Puyo on 18 May 1976.

It remains exempt, i.e. directly subject to the Holy See, not part of any ecclesiastical province.

== Incumbent Ordinaries ==
Apostolic prefects of Canelos (y Macas) (all Dominicans)

("y Macas" dropped 19 Feb. 1930)

- Enrique Ezequiel Vacas Galindo, O.P. † (1898 - 1909)
- Alvaro Valladares, O.P. † (29 July 1909 - 17 March 1926)
- Agostino M. León, O.P. † (17 March 1926 – June 1936)
- Giacinto Maria D’Avila, O.P. † (16 Sep. 1936 – 1948)
- Sebastião Acosta Hurtado, O.P. † (12 Nov. 1948 – 1958)
- Alberto Zambrano Palacios, O.P. † (24 Jan. 1959 – 29 Sept. 1964); see below

Apostolic vicars of Canelos / Puyo

(change from "Canelos" to "Puyo" 18 May 1976)

- Alberto Zambrano Palacios, O.P. † (29 Sept 1964 - 11 Dec. 1972), appointed Bishop of Loja; see above
- Tomás Angel Romero Gross, O.P. † (5 July 1973 – 28 Feb. 1990)
- Frumencio Escudero Arenas (6 Oct. 1992 – 25 July 1998)
- Rafael Cob García (28 Nov. 1998 – present)

== See also ==
- Roman Catholicism in Ecuador
