= Carpi (Africa) =

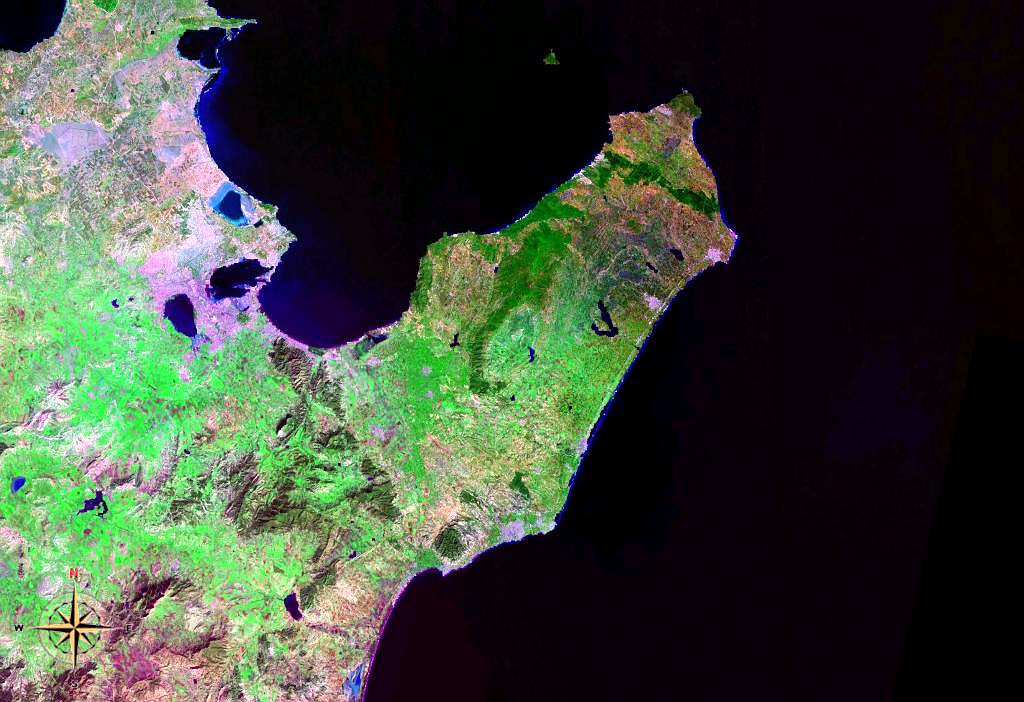
Area around Carpi from space (false color)

Carpi was a Roman era city in the Roman province of Africa Proconsolare, and has been tentatively identified with ruins at El Mraïssa Henchir-Mraïssa, (or Marsa) on Cape Bon in Tunisia.

The El Mraïssa ruins are nearby to Ra's Degbi Marsa, Ras el Fortas and Henchir Bir Jedi. El Mraïssa is also close to where the Oued Oum el Hallalif river enters the Mediterranean Sea.

The Roman city was also the seat of an ancient Christian Bishopric under the leadership of the Bishop of Carthage. The diocese survives today as a titular see of the Roman Catholic Church, and the current bishop is Ramon Bejarano.
