= Diocese of Guaranda =

Roman Catholic diocese in Ecuador

Coordinates: 1.5928°S 79.0014°W

Diocese of Guaranda Dioecesis Guarandensis

Catholic

Location
- Country: Ecuador
- Ecclesiastical province: Province of Quito

Statistics
- Area: 3,336 km^{2} (1,288 sq mi)
- Population: Total; Catholics: (as of 2006); 188,500; 162,100 (86%)
- Parishes: 30

Information
- Denomination: Roman Catholic
- Rite: Latin Rite
- Established: 29 December 1957 (68 years ago)
- Cathedral: San Pedro Cathedral

Current leadership
- Pope: Leo XIV
- Bishop: Hermenegildo José Torres Asanza

Map
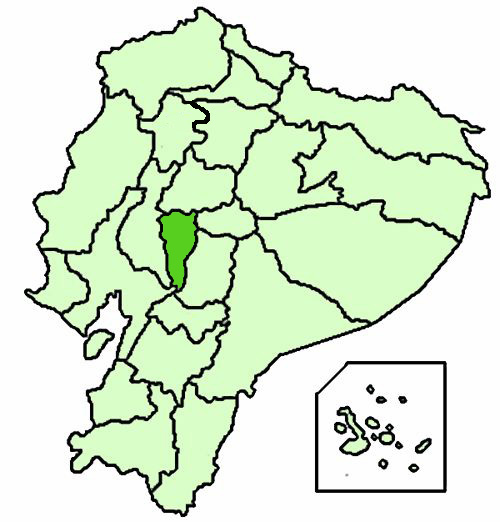

The Roman Catholic Diocese of Guaranda (Latin: Dioecesis Guarandensis) is a diocese located in the city of Guaranda in the ecclesiastical province of Quito. It was erected on 29 December 1957 from territory from the Diocese of Riobamba.

== Bishops ==
- Gilberto Tapia (10 Dec 1957 – 1958), did not take effect
- Cándido Rada Senosiáin, S.D.B. (31 Mar 1960 – 24 May 1980)
- Raúl Holguer López Mayorga (24 May 1980 – 18 Jun 1990), appointed Bishop of Latacunga
- Miguel Angel Aguilar Miranda (11 Apr 1991 – 14 Feb 2004), appointed Bishop of Ecuador, Military
- Ángel Polibio Sánchez Loayza (25 Nov 2004 – 20 Jul 2013), appointed Bishop of Machala
- Skiper Bladimir Yáñez Calvachi (24 Jun 2014 - 27 Mar 2018), appointed Bishop of Babahoyo
- Hermenegildo José Torres Asanza (4 Oct 2018–present)

=== Coadjutor bishop ===
- Raúl Holguer López Mayorga (1974-1980)

=== Auxiliary bishop ===
- Raúl Holguer López Mayorga (1973-1974), appointed Coadjutor here

=== Another priest of this diocese who became bishop ===
- Fausto Feliciano Gaibor García, appointed Auxiliary Bishop of Riobamba in 2006

== Special churches ==
The Santuario Nacional de Nuestra Señora María Natividad del Guayco (English: National Shrine of the Nativity of Our Lady) is located within the diocese, in the parish of Magdalena, canton of Chimbo.
