= Apostolic vicariate =

Territorial jurisdiction of the Catholic Church

An apostolic vicariate is a territorial jurisdiction of the Catholic Church under a titular bishop centered in missionary regions and countries where dioceses or parishes have not yet been established. The status of apostolic vicariate is often a promotion for a former apostolic prefecture, while either may have started out as a mission sui iuris. It is essentially provisional, though it may last for a century or more. The hope is that the region will generate sufficient numbers of Catholics for the Church to create a diocese one day.

It is exempt under canon law, directly subject to the missionary Dicastery for Evangelization of the Vatican in Rome. Like the stage of apostolic prefecture which often precedes it, the vicariate is not part of an ecclesiastical province. It is intended to mature in developing Catholic members until it can be promoted to a (usually suffragan) diocese.

The Eastern Catholic and Eastern Orthodox Church counterpart is an (apostolic, patriarchal, or archiepiscopal) exarchate.

== Institution ==
An apostolic vicariate is led by a vicar apostolic, who is usually a titular bishop. While such a territory can be classed as a particular church, according to canon 371.1 of the Latin Code of Canon Law, a vicar apostolic's jurisdiction is an exercise of the jurisdiction of the pope—the territory comes directly under the pope as "universal bishop", and the pope exercises this authority through a "vicar". This is unlike the jurisdiction of a diocesan bishop, whose jurisdiction derives directly from his office.

Like any ecclesiastical jurisdiction, an apostolic vicariate may be administered by the bishop of a neighbouring diocese, or by a priest appointed transitionally as an apostolic administrator. As in a regular diocese, the vicar apostolic may appoint priests as vicars exercising limited jurisdiction over the apostolic vicariate. Normally, a titular bishop is appointed to administer the apostolic vicariate. When someone who does not qualify or has not been ordained as bishop is appointed ad interim, he may be styled Pro-vicar.

An apostolic vicariate is to be distinguished from an apostolic prefecture, a similar type of territory whose chief distinction from an apostolic vicariate is that its prefect is not a titular bishop, but a priest. The prefecture is not considered organised enough to be elevated to apostolic vicariate. The less developed instance is the mission sui iuris, which other than the ones mentioned before is not a particular church, although it shares some similarities to one; at its head, an ecclesiastical superior is named. The usual sequence of development is mission, apostolic prefecture, apostolic vicariate, and finally diocese (or even archdiocese). See also apostolic exarch for an Eastern Catholic counterpart.

The apostolic vicariate is distinguished from a territorial abbacy (or "abbey nullius")—an area not a diocese but under the direction of the abbot of a monastery.

Starting in 2019, new vicars apostolic, although they are (or become) bishops, are no longer assigned titular sees.

== List ==
=== Current apostolic vicariates ===
==== Africa ====
- Apostolic Vicariate of Alexandria of Egypt
- Apostolic Vicariate of Awasa, Ethiopia
- Apostolic Vicariate of Benghazi, Libya
- Apostolic Vicariate of Derna, Libya
- Apostolic Vicariate of Harar, Ethiopia
- Apostolic Vicariate of Hosanna, Ethiopia
- Apostolic Vicariate of Ingwavuma, South Africa
- Apostolic Vicariate of Makokou in Gabon
- Apostolic Vicariate of Meki, Ethiopia
- Apostolic Vicariate of Mongo, Chad
- Apostolic Vicariate of Nekemte, Ethiopia
- Apostolic Vicariate of Rodrigues, Mauritius
- Apostolic Vicariate of Rundu, Namibia
- Apostolic Vicariate of Soddo, Ethiopia
- Apostolic Vicariate of Tripoli, Libya

==== The Americas ====
- Apostolic Vicariate of Aguarico, Ecuador
- Apostolic Vicariate of Aysén, Chile
- Apostolic Vicariate of Camiri, Bolivia
- Apostolic Vicariate of Caroní, Venezuela
- Apostolic Vicariate of Chaco Paraguayo, Paraguay
- Apostolic Vicariate of Darién, Panama
- Apostolic Vicariate of El Beni, Bolivia
- Apostolic Vicariate of El Petén, Guatemala
- Apostolic Vicariate of Esmeraldas, Ecuador
- Apostolic Vicariate of Galapagos, Ecuador
- Apostolic Vicariate of Guapi, Colombia
- Apostolic Vicariate of Inírida, Colombia
- Apostolic Vicariate of Iquitos, Peru
- Apostolic Vicariate of Jaén in Peru/San Francisco Javier
- Apostolic Vicariate of Leticia, Colombia
- Apostolic Vicariate of Méndez, Ecuador
- Apostolic Vicariate of Mitú, Colombia
- Apostolic Vicariate of Napo, Ecuador
- Apostolic Vicariate of Ñuflo de Chávez, Bolivia
- Apostolic Vicariate of Pando, Bolivia
- Apostolic Vicariate of Pilcomayo, Paraguay
- Apostolic Vicariate of Pucallpa, Peru
- Apostolic Vicariate of Puerto Ayacucho, Venezuela
- Apostolic Vicariate of Puerto Carreño, Colombia
- Apostolic Vicariate of Puerto Gaitán, Colombia
- Apostolic Vicariate of Puerto Leguízamo-Solano, Colombia
- Apostolic Vicariate of Puerto Maldonado, Peru
- Apostolic Vicariate of Puyo, Ecuador
- Apostolic Vicariate of Requena, Peru
- Apostolic Vicariate of Reyes, Bolivia
- Apostolic Vicariate of San Andrés y Providencia, Colombia
- Apostolic Vicariate of San José de Amazonas, Peru
- Apostolic Vicariate of San Miguel de Sucumbíos, Ecuador
- Apostolic Vicariate of San Ramon, Peru
- Apostolic Vicariate of Tierradentro, Colombia
- Apostolic Vicariate of Trinidad, Colombia
- Apostolic Vicariate of Tucupita, Venezuela
- Apostolic Vicariate of Yurimaguas, Peru
- Apostolic Vicariate of Zamora, Ecuador

==== Asia ====
- Apostolic Vicariate of Aleppo, Syria
- Apostolic Vicariate of Anatolia, Turkey
- Apostolic Vicariate of Beirut, Lebanon
- Apostolic Vicariate of Bontoc-Lagawe, Philippines
- Apostolic Vicariate of Brunei Darussalam, Brunei
- Apostolic Vicariate of Jolo, Philippines
- Apostolic Vicariate of Luang Prabang, Laos
- Apostolic Vicariate of Nepal, Nepal
- Apostolic Vicariate of Northern Arabia, Kuwait, Qatar, Bahrain and Saudi Arabia
- Apostolic Vicariate of Paksé, Laos
- Apostolic Vicariate of Phnom Penh, Cambodia
- Apostolic Vicariate of Puerto Princesa, Philippines
- Apostolic Vicariate of Quetta, Pakistan
- Apostolic Vicariate of San Jose in Mindoro, Philippines
- Apostolic Vicariate of Savannakhet, Laos
- Apostolic Vicariate of Southern Arabia, Oman, United Arab Emirates and Yemen
- Apostolic Vicariate of Tabuk, Philippines
- Apostolic Vicariate of Taytay, Philippines
- Apostolic Vicariate of Vientiane, Laos

==== Europe ====
- Apostolic Vicariate of Thessaloniki, Greece
- Apostolic Vicariate of Istanbul, Turkey

=== Historical apostolic vicariates ===
(incomplete)

Inactive apostolic vicariates (or former names, often promoted to diocese) are in italics. Eastern Catholic (mostly Byzantine Rite) apostolic vicariates are in bold.

==== Africa ====
- Apostolic Vicariate of Bomadi, Nigeria
- Apostolic Vicariate of the Congo
- Apostolic Vicariate of Dahomey
- Apostolic Vicariate of Donkorkrom, Ghana
- Apostolic Vicariate of French Congo, or Lower Congo
- Apostolic Vicariate of Francistown, Botswana
- Apostolic Vicariate of Isiolo, Kenya
- Apostolic Vicariate of Kamerun, Cameroon
- Apostolic Vicariate of Kenia, Kenya
- Apostolic Vicariate of Kimberley in Orange, South Africa
- Apostolic Vicariate of Kontagora, Nigeria
- Apostolic Vicariate of Mauritius
- Apostolic Vicariate of Northern Victoria Nyanza
- Apostolic Vicariate of Sahara
- Apostolic Vicariate of Senegambia
- Apostolic Vicariate of Shire
- Apostolic Vicariate of Sudan or Central-Africa
- Apostolic Vicariate of Unyanyembe

==== The Americas ====
- Apostolic Vicariate of Alaska
- Apostolic Vicariate of San José de Amazonas
- Apostolic Vicariate of Athabasca
- Apostolic Vicariate of Beni
- Apostolic Vicariate of Bluefields, Nicaragua
- Apostolic Vicariate of Casanare
- Apostolic Vicariate of Dakota Territory
- Apostolic Vicariate of Goajira
- Apostolic Vicariate of Izabal, Guatemala
- Apostolic Vicariate of Keewatin
- Apostolic Vicariate of Limón, Costa Rica
- Apostolic Vicariate of Lower California
- Apostolic Vicariate of Machiques, Venezuela
- Apostolic Vicariate of Magallanes, Chile
- Apostolic Vicariate of Marysville
- Apostolic Vicariate of Mackenzie
- Apostolic Vicariate of Montevideo, Uruguay (erected 1830, promoted to Diocese 1878)
- Apostolic Vicariate of Nebraska, United States
- Apostolic Vicariate of Northern Minnesota
- Apostolic Vicariate of Riohacha, Colombia
- Apostolic Vicariate of San Gabriel de la Dolorosa del Maranon (renamed Yurimaguas), Peru
- Apostolic Vicariate of San José del Guaviare, Colombia
- Apostolic Vicariate of San Vicente del Caguán, Colombia
- Apostolic Vicariate of Iles Saint-Pierre et Miquelon, Saint-Pierre et Miquelon, in 2018 merged to Diocese of La Rochelle and Sainte
- Apostolic Vicariate of Sucumbíos
- Apostolic Vicariate of Ucayali, Peru (was suppressed in 1956 by erection of three new vicariates)

==== Asia ====
- Apostolic Vicariate of Amoy, China
- Apostolic Vicariate of Batavia, Indonesia
- Apostolic Vicariate of Calapan, Philippines
- Apostolic Vicariate of Changanacherry, India
- Apostolic Vicariate of Ernakulam, India
- Apostolic Vicariate of Kiang-nan, China
- Apostolic Vicariate of Kottayam, India
- Apostolic Vicariate of Lhasa, Sikkim and Tibet
- Apostolic Vicariate of Madras, India
- Apostolic Vicariate of Northern Kan-Su, China
- Apostolic Vicariate of Kienchang, China
- Apostolic Vicariate of Northern Shan-Si, China
- Apostolic Vicariate of Northern Shantung, China
- Apostolic Vicariate of Patna, India
- Apostolic Vicariate of Southern Shan-Si, China
- Apostolic Vicariate of Southern Shan-Tung, China
- Apostolic Vicariate of Southern Shen-Si, China
- Apostolic Vicariate of Shunking, China
- Apostolic Vicariate of Szechwan, China
- Apostolic Vicariate of Southern Szechwan, China
- Apostolic Vicariate of Southeastern Szechwan, China
- Apostolic Vicariate of Tibet-Hindustan, India and Tibet
- Apostolic Vicariate of Trichur, India
- Apostolic Vicariate of Wanhsien, China
- Apostolic Vicariate of Yachow, China

==== Europe ====
- Apostolic Vicariate of Bosnia, former Ottoman Empire
- **Bulgarian Catholic Apostolic Vicariate of Constantinople**, former Ottoman Empire
- Apostolic Vicariate of Gibraltar
- Apostolic Vicariate of Herzegovina, former Ottoman Empire
- **Bulgarian Catholic Apostolic Vicariate of Macedonia**, former Ottoman Empire
- **Apostolic Vicariate of Marča**, Croatia
- Apostolic Vicariate of Northern Germany (Apostolic Vicariate of the Nordic Missions)
- Apostolic Vicariate of England
- Apostolic Vicariate of Scotland
- **Bulgarian Catholic Apostolic Vicariate of Thrace**, former Ottoman Empire
- Apostolic Vicariate of Upper and Lower Saxony
- Apostolic Vicariate of Saxony

==== Oceania ====
- Apostolic Vicariate of Alexishafen
- Apostolic Vicariate of Central Oceania
- Apostolic Vicariate of Fiji
- Apostolic Vicariate of the Gilbert Islands
- Apostolic Vicariate of Marquesas Islands
- Apostolic Vicariate of New Pomerania
- Apostolic Vicariate of Oriental Oceania
- Apostolic Vicariate of Sandwich Islands
- Apostolic Vicariate of Tahiti
- Apostolic Vicariate of Western Oceania

== See also ==
- List of Catholic dioceses (alphabetical)
- List of Catholic dioceses (structured view)
- List of Catholic archdioceses
- List of Catholic military ordinariates/dioceses
- List of Catholic apostolic administrations
- List of Catholic exarchates
- List of Catholic apostolic prefectures
- List of Catholic territorial prelatures
- List of Catholic missions sui juris
