= Herceg Novi =

Town and municipality in Coastal Montenegro

- Town and municipality
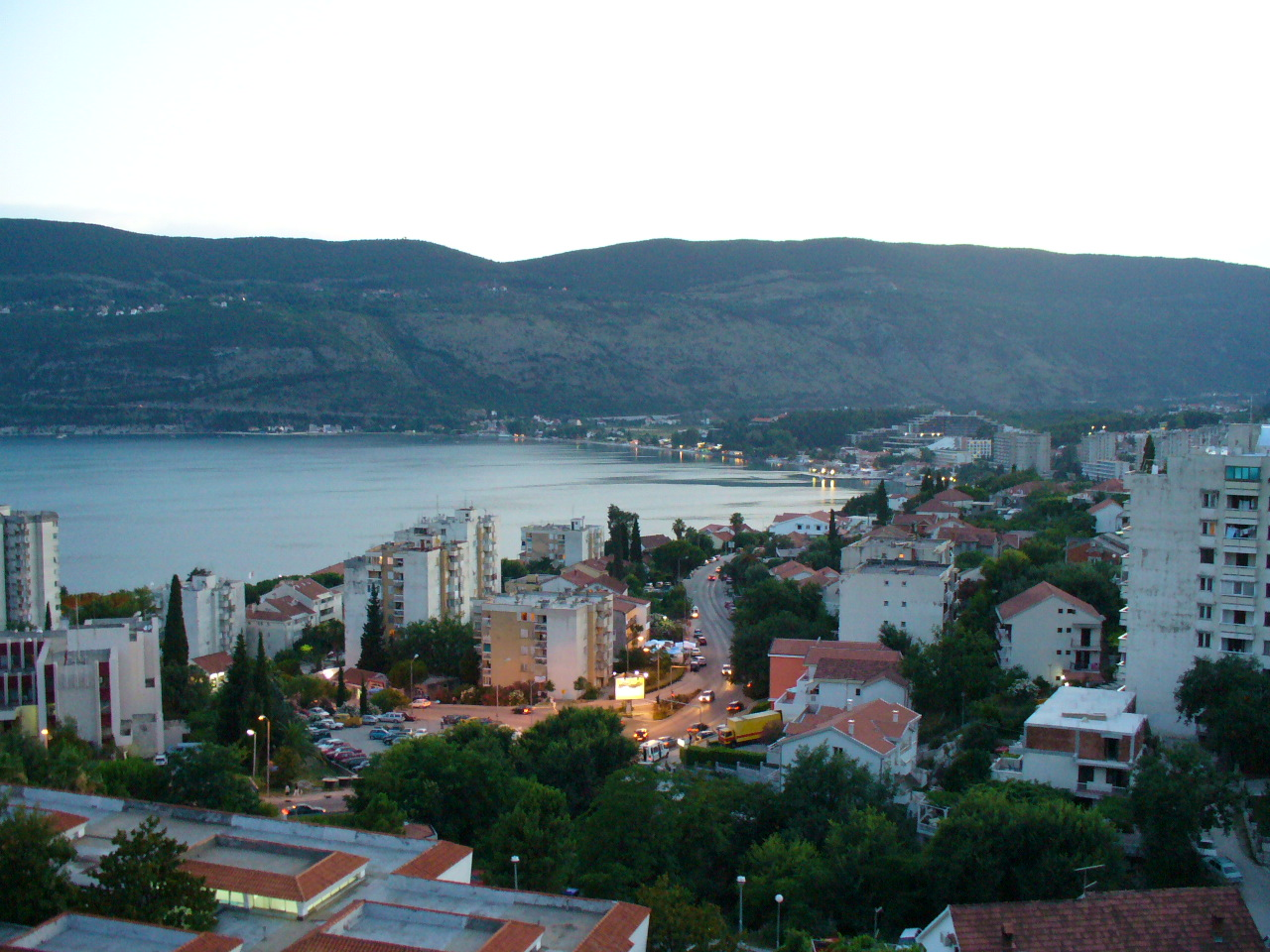
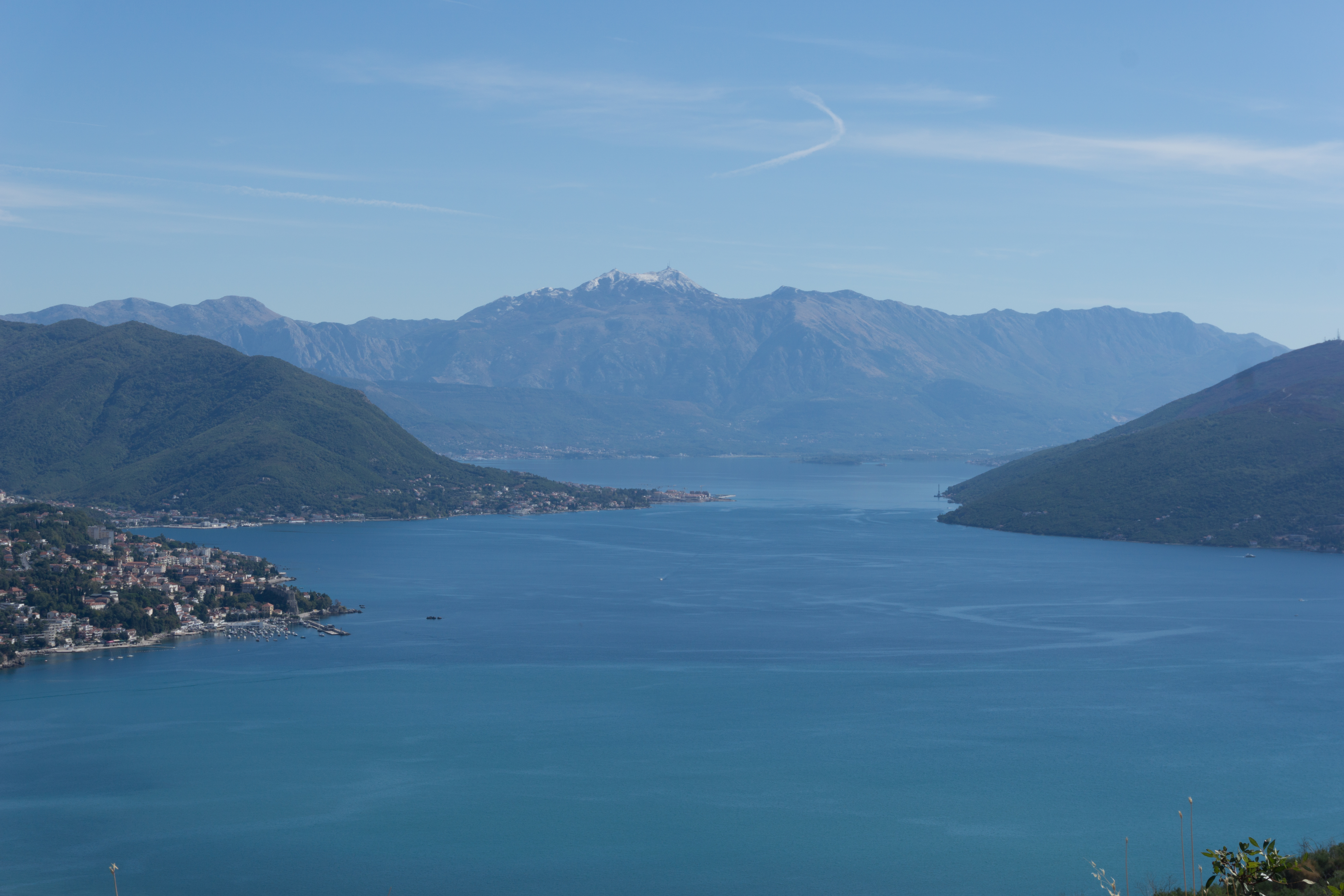
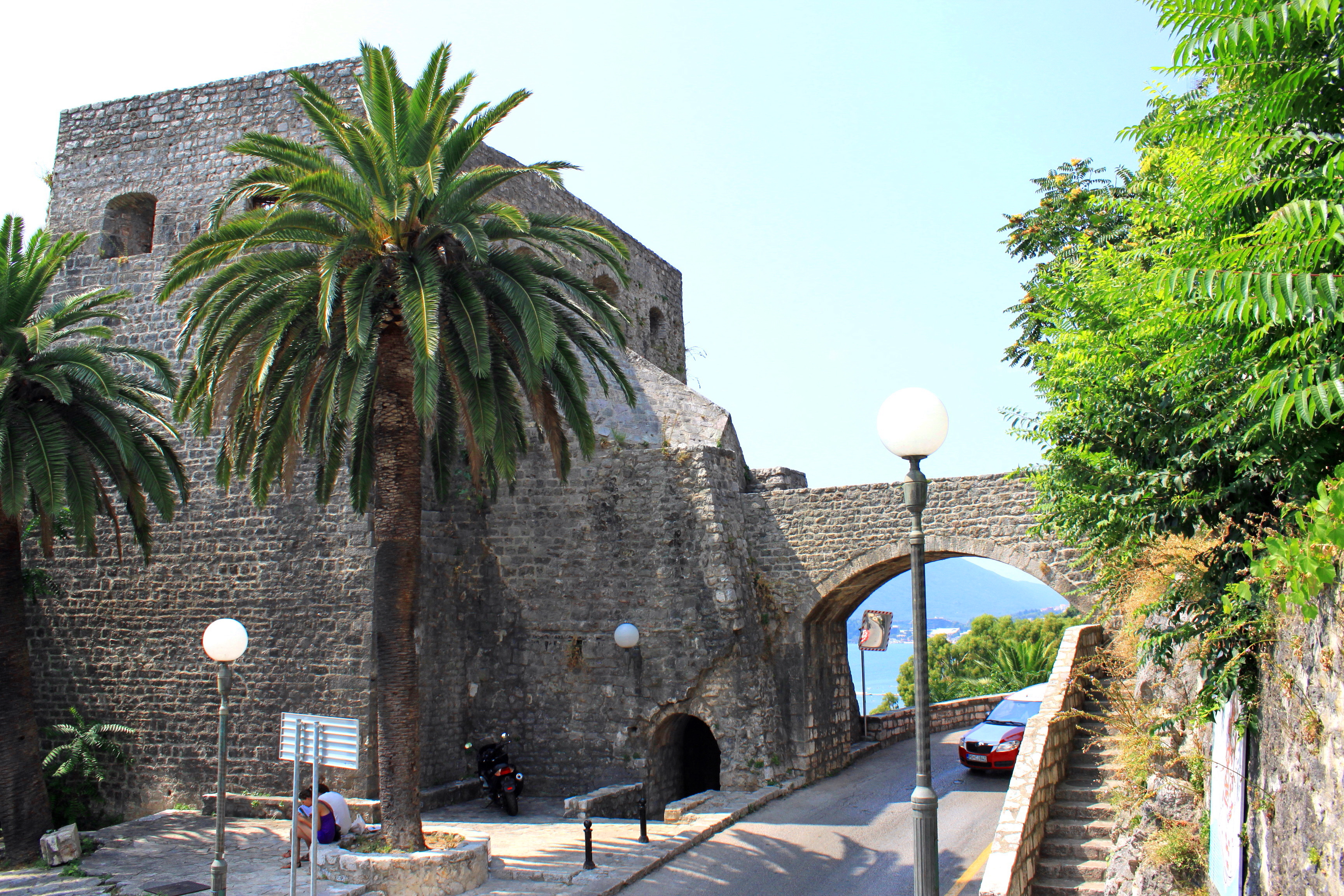
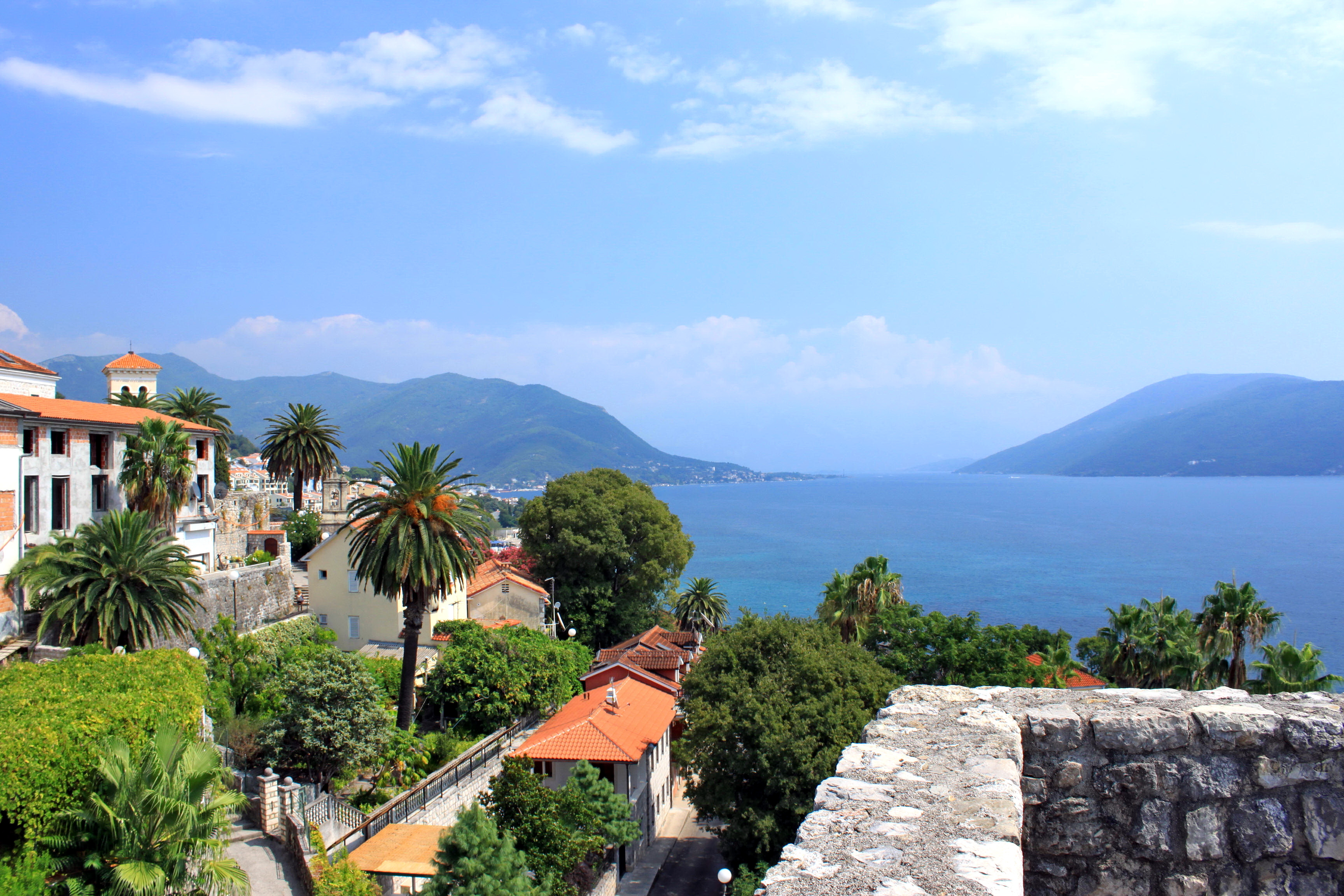
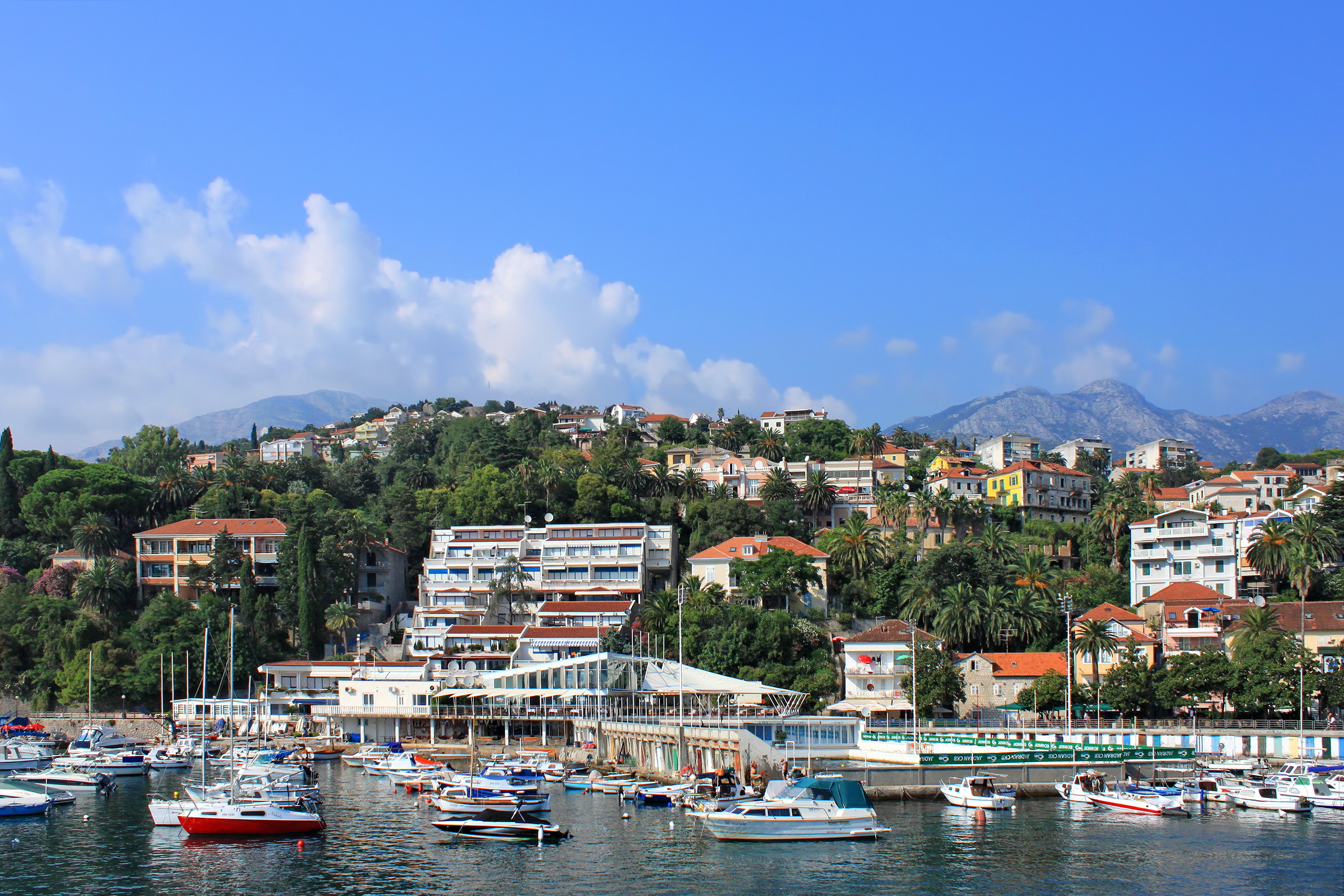
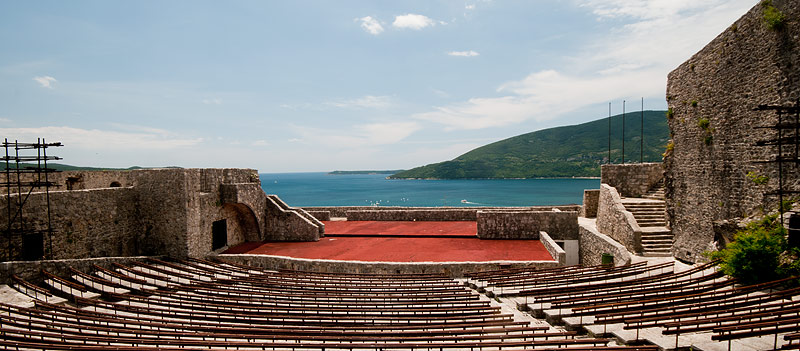
- Clockwise from top: Panorama of Herceg Novi; Forte Mare Fortress; Harbor; Kanli Kula Amphitheatre; View from Forte Mare Fortress; View from Žvinje

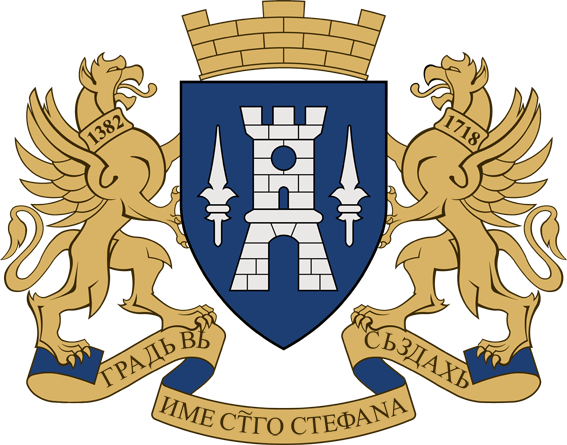
- Flag Coat of arms

- Location within Montenegro Herceg Novi (Balkans)
- Coordinates: 42°27′10.62″N 18°31′52.33″E
- Country: Montenegro
- Region: Coastal
- Municipality: Herceg Novi
- Founded as Sveti Stefan: 1382
- Settlements: 27

Government
  - Type: Mayor-Assembly
  - Mayor: Stevan Katić (DCG)

Area
  - Town and municipality: 235 km^{2} (91 sq mi)

Population (2011 census)
  - Rank: 3rd in Montenegro
  - Density: 140/km^{2} (360/sq mi)
  - Urban: 19,536
  - Rural: 11,328
  - Municipality: 30,864
- Time zone: UTC+1 (CET)
  - Summer (DST): UTC+2 (CEST)
- Postal code: 85340
- Area code: +382 31
- ISO 3166-2 code: ME-08
- Car plates: HN
- Website: www.hercegnovi.me

Herceg Novi (Cyrillic: Херцег Нови, pronounced [xěrtseɡ nôviː]) is a town in Coastal region of Montenegro located at the Western entrance to the Bay of Kotor and at the foot of Mount Orjen. It is the administrative center of the Herceg Novi Municipality with around 33,000 inhabitants. The town was founded as a fortress in 1382 by the King of Bosnia, Tvrtko I Kotromanić, and named after Saint Stephen but the name did not stick, instead it became known as Novi (transl. New), also Castelnuovo in Italian (transl. New Castle). Between 1482 and 1687 it was part of the Ottoman Empire and then from 1687 to 1797 the Albania Veneta of the Republic of Venice. It was a Catholic bishopric and remains a Latin titular see as Novi. Herceg Novi has had a turbulent past, despite being one of the youngest settlements on the Adriatic. A history of varied occupations has created a blend of diverse and picturesque architectural styles in the city.

== Names and etymology ==
Tvrtko I of Bosnia founded the town and named it after Saint Stephen, the name that from the beginning gave way to a name Novi, which literally translates to "New", as in Newtown; also known as Castelnuovo in Italian, New Castle in English. Later the town came into the Kosača noble family's possession and become their winter seat. During this era, the town was renamed again by adding Stjepan Vukčić Kosača's title herceg (prince, Serbo-Croatian pronunciation of German herzog) to the name Novi, which gave it the current name of Herceg Novi.

In Serbo-Croatian, the town is known as Herceg Novi or Херцег Нови; in Italian as Castelnuovo; and in Greek as Neókastron (Νεόκαστρον), Ottoman Turkish as Kala-i Novi, and modern Turkish as Kastelnovo, all except the first meaning 'new castle'. The name Herceg Novi, in its modern form, was first mentioned in a Turkish document in 1726.

== History ==
Archeological findings from the Luštica peninsula and the Vranjaj cavern imply that the area was populated during the Neolithic and early Bronze Age. In the 3rd century BC, after their victory over the Illyrians, the area was ruled by the Roman Republic. After the split of the Roman Empire, the area fell under the rule of the Western Roman Empire and after its fall, the Eastern Roman Empire also known as Byzantine Empire. Slavic tribes began inhabiting these lands during the 7th century AD. During these times the small settlement was part of Byzantine-held Dračevica district, which in turn later belonged to the Principality of Travunija. During the 10th century, Dračevica came under the control of various Dioclean/Zetan dukes, who were in turn incorporated into Kingdom of Serbia ruled by the Nemanjić dynasty. After the death of Emperor Stefan Dušan, the Serbian Empire began to fracture into smaller principalities and districts, with Dračevica being administered by duke Vojislav Vojinović. After the rulership of Vojinović, the area, along with most of modern Montenegro, came under the rule of the Balšić noble family.

=== Foundation under Bosnia ===
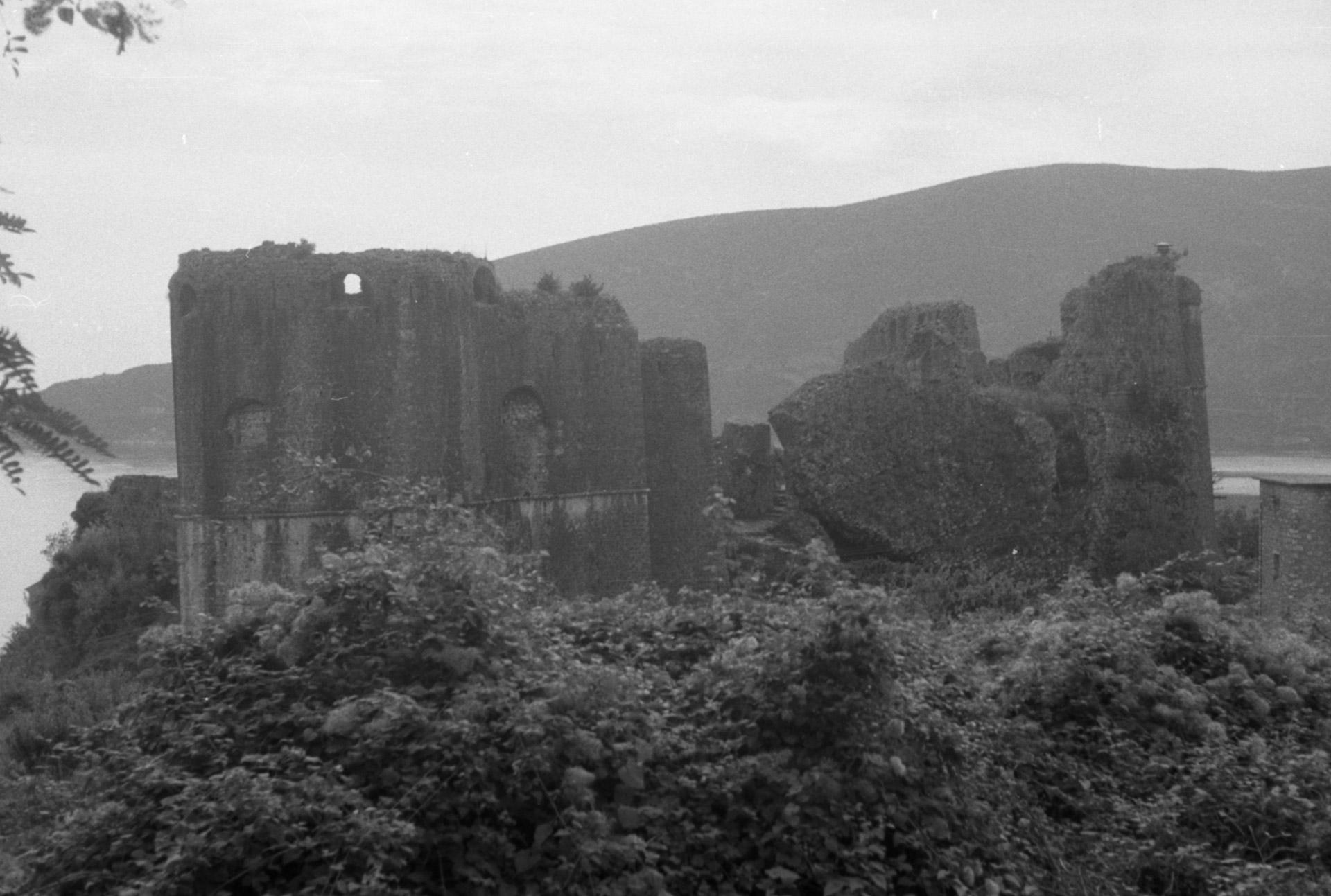
The fortress of Novi built by Tvrtko I, overlooking 'Stari Grad' (Old Town of Herceg Novi) and the Adriatic in Bay of Kotor

Bosnia could not make economical use of Bosansko Primorje, as its share of the Adriatic coast from the river Neretva to the Bay of Kotor lacked any major settlements. In the second half of the 14th century area in Bay of Kotor also became part of the Kingdom of Bosnia. The Bosnian king, Tvrtko, embroiled in the War of Chioggia, which erupted between the old-time rival Republics of Venice and Genoa in 1378 will, as a result, find himself pressured by the circumstances of failure to seize Kotor, the damage to the Bosnian economy from the Ragusan embargo, and the need for easy access to maritime trade. This and the fact that Bosansko Primorje had no significant port led Tvrtko to found the youngest medieval town on the eastern Adriatic coast. In early 1382, Tvrtko constructed a new fortress in the Bay of Kotor on the place of a small fishing village and decided that it should form the basis of a new salt trading center. Initially named after Saint Stephen, the city immediately came to be known as Novi (meaning "new").

After the death of Tvrtko, Duke Sandalj Hranić of the Hum lords, Kosačas, acquired Novi. During his reign, the town picked up trading salt. When Hranić died, his nephew, Duke Stjepan Vukčić Kosača inherited it. During his reign, the town grew in importance and became Stjepan's winter seat, getting a new name in the process: Herceg Novi.

=== Under the Ottomans ===
The Ottomans conquered Herceg Novi before 14 December 1481, and ruled for 200 years. The Ottomans built Kanli Tower on the upper edge of the city. However, there was a short pause between 1538 and 1539 when it was held by the Spaniards before they were defeated in the Siege of Castelnuovo. In their brief overlordship, the Spanish built a Hispaniola fort above the city that is well-preserved today. Evliya Çelebi visits the Bay of Kotor and mentions Croats, Bosnians and Albanians (Arnauts) who live in the Herceg Novi.

In 1608 an earthquake struck Herceg Novi and devastated it.

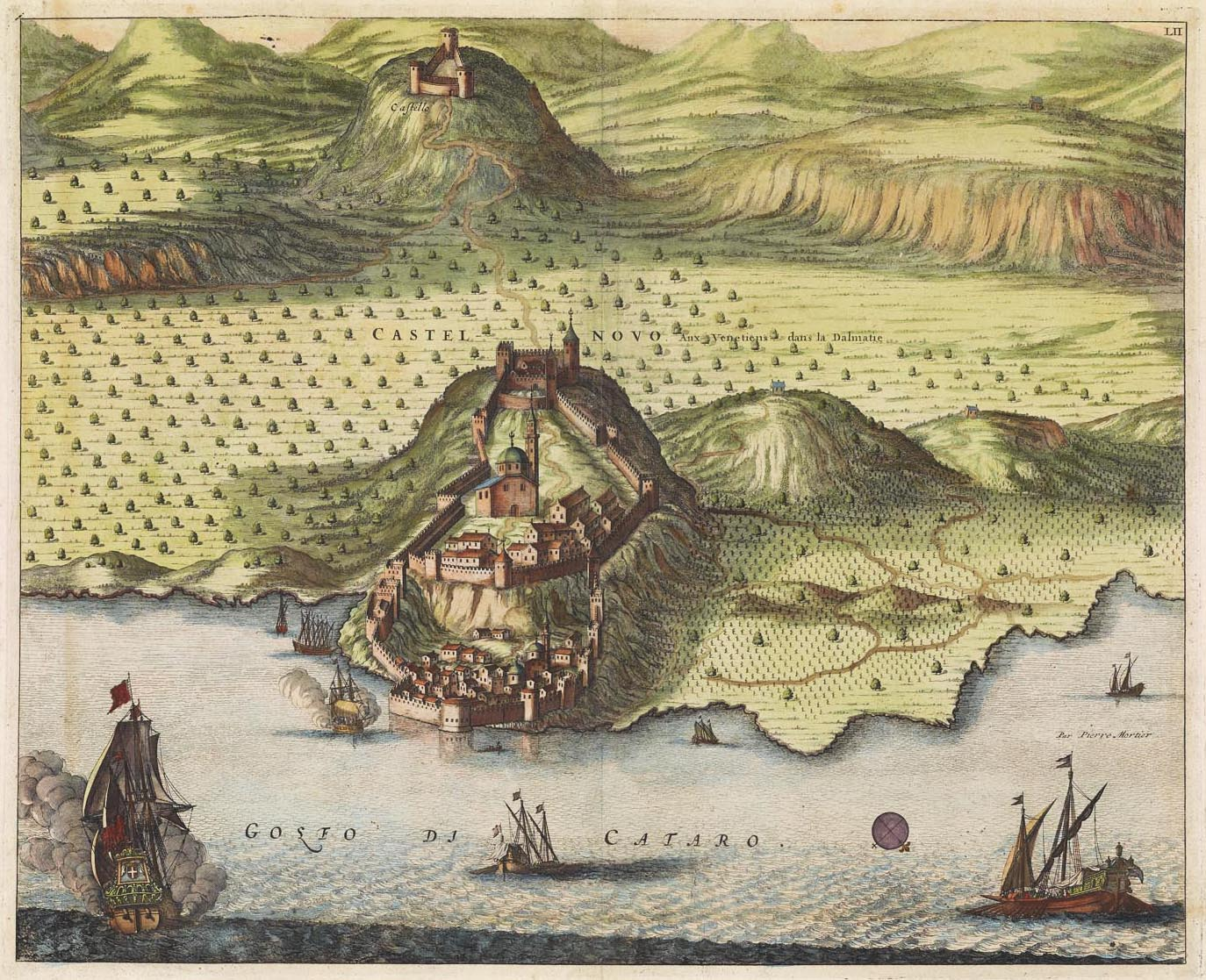
Herceg Novi in 1700, Albania Veneta

=== Modern Age ===
In 1687, the city was captured by the Republic of Venice under Girolamo Corner, and included it into Albania Veneta, an administrative unit on the territory of present-day coastal Montenegro. In Venice, the city was known as Castelnuovo. The Venetians refortified the old town walls and towers and reinforced the fortress with a Citadella Tower (destroyed in an earthquake in 1979). On 24 August 1798, Herceg Novi was annexed by Habsburg Austria but was then ceded to Russia as per the Treaty of Pressburg on 26 December 1805. The Russians officially occupied Herceg Novi between 28 February 1806 and 12 August 1807.

On 7 July 1807, Herceg Novi was ceded to Napoleon I Bonaparte's French Empire as per the Treaty of Tilsit. Official French rule over Herceg Novi began on 12 August 1807, when the Russians left the city. The city was part of Dalmatia until 14 October 1809, when it was annexed to the newly created Illyrian Provinces.

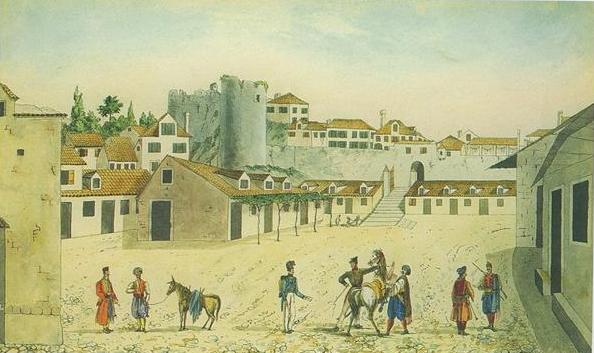
Herceg Novi in 1837

Herceg Novi, as well as the rest of the Bay of Kotor, was overtaken by Montenegrin forces in 1813. It was under control of a temporary government based in Dobrota between 11 September 1813 and 10 June 1814, which was supported by Montenegro. The appearance of Austrian forces in 1814 caused the Prince-Bishop of Montenegro to turn over the territory to Austrian administration on 11 June. After Herceg Novi was retaken, as well as the rest of the bay, it became part of the Dalmatian crownland. The bay was under Austro-Hungarian control until 1918.

=== 20th century ===
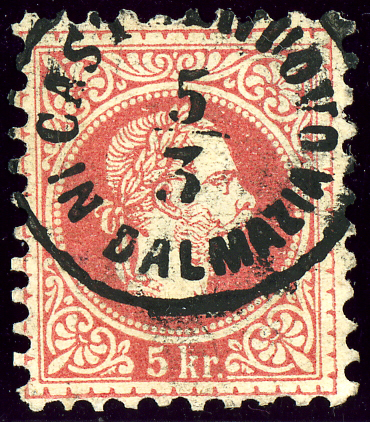
Austrian KK stamp issued in 1867 cancelled Castelnuovo in Dalmazia

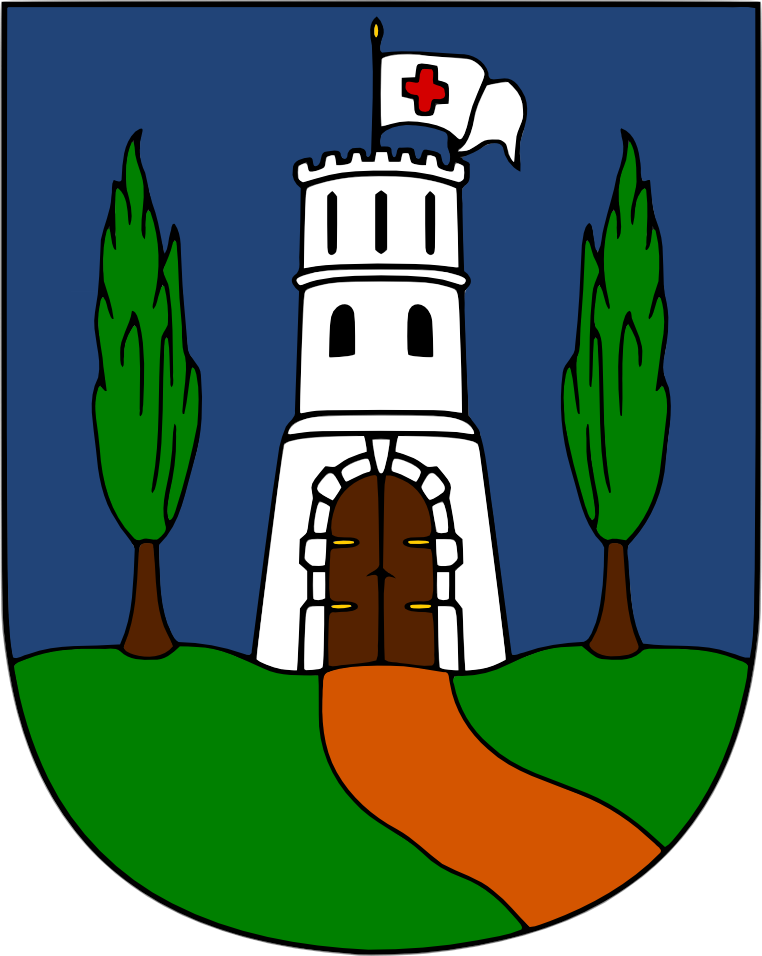
Former coat of arms of Herceg Novi

In 1900, the two names ERZEG NOVI and CASTELNUOVO PRESSO CATTARO were used in bilingual cancellations.

The Kingdom of Montenegro attempted to retake the Bay of Kotor during World War I, it was bombarded from Lovćen, but by 1916 Austria-Hungary defeated Montenegro.

On 7 November 1918, the Serbian Army entered the bay and were greeted by the people as Slavic liberators. The bay later became a part of the self-proclaimed State of Slovenes, Croats and Serbs. Within a month, this region united with Serbia as part of the Kingdom of Serbs, Croats and Slovenes, renamed to Yugoslavia in 1929. The bay was a municipality of Dalmatia until it was, like all historic entities, abolished in 1922. It was incorporated into the Zeta Oblast (province), from 1929 style Zeta Banate.

Herceg Novi was annexed by Mussolini's fascist Italy during World War II in 1941. It became a part of the province of Cattaro.

Herceg Novi was later retaken by Yugoslav Partisan forces on 10 September 1943. Within Tito's Communist reformed Yugoslavia, Herceg Novi became part of the People's Republic of Montenegro.

On 8 April 1970, following the USSR vs. Rest of the World 'Match of the Century' hosted in Belgrade, Yugoslavia, a blitz chess tournament was held in Herceg Novi, featuring four World Champions, the field was considered the strongest of any blitz tournament in modern chess history.

== Ecclesiastical history ==
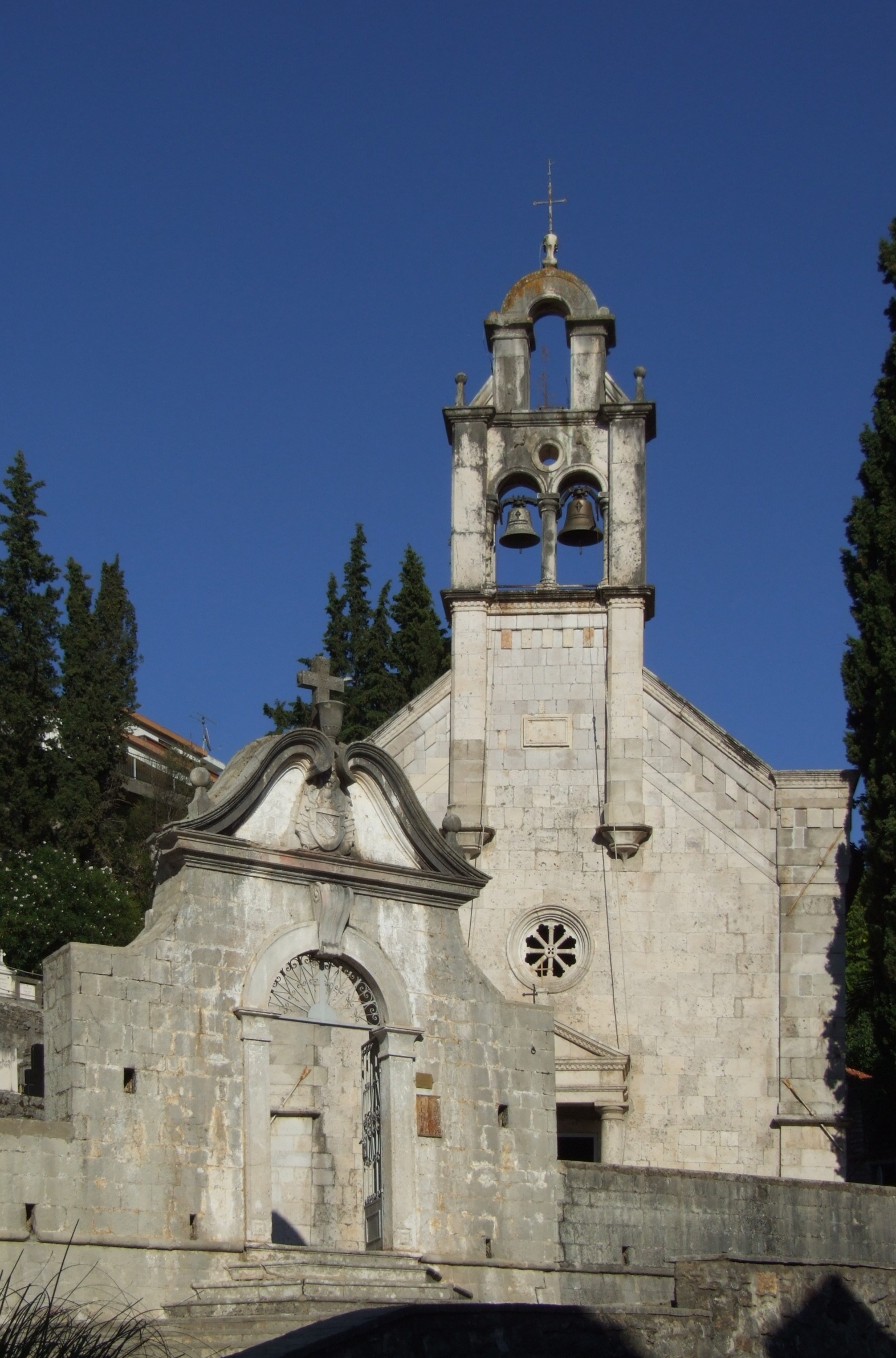
Serbian Orthodox Church of the Holy Savior in Topla

It once was a Catholic bishopric, but no residential incumbent data are available.

=== Titular see ===
In 1933 the diocese was nominally restored by establishing in the Latin Church of the Catholic Church a titular bishopric of Novi (in Dalmatia), listed as suffragan of the Archdiocese of Doclea (which in Classical times controlled its region in the Roman province of Dalmatia Superior).

The following individuals held the titular bishopric. They were either auxiliary bishops or officials of the Vatican:

- Abel Costas Montaño (1968.11.11 – 1974.12.11), as Auxiliary Bishop of the Roman Catholic Diocese of Cochabamba (Bolivia) (1968.11.11 – 1974.12.11); later Bishop of Tarija (Bolivia) (1974.12.11 – retired 1995.10.20); died 2015
- Alfred Gonti Pius Datubara, Capuchin Franciscans (O.F.M. Cap.) (1975.04.05 – 1976.05.24) as Auxiliary Bishop of the Roman Catholic Archdiocese of Medan (Indonesia) (1975.04.05 – 1976.05.24); succeeded later as Metropolitan Archbishop of above Medan (1976.05.24 – retired 2009.02.12)
- Juan Ignacio Larrea Holguín (1983.08.05 – 1988.03.25) as last Military Vicar of the Military Vicariate of Ecuador (Ecuador) (1983.08.05 – 1986.07.21) and first Military Ordinary of Ecuador (1986.07.21 – 1989.12.07); later Coadjutor Archbishop of Guayaquil (Ecuador) (1988.03.25 – 1989.12.07), succeeding as Metropolitan Archbishop of Guayaquil (1989.12.07 – retired 2003.05.07), died 2006; previously Titular Bishop of Cellæ in Proconsulari (1969.05.17 – 1980.06.28) as Auxiliary Bishop of Quito (Ecuador) (1969.05.17 – 1980.06.28?), Bishop of Ibarra (Ecuador) (1980.06.28 – 1983.08.05)
- Jan Lebeda (1988.05.19 – 1991.11.05) as Auxiliary Bishop of the Roman Catholic Archdiocese of Praha (Prague, Czechoslovakia) (1988.05.19 – death 1991.11.05)
- Titular Archbishop: Ernesto Maria Fiore (1991.12.16 – 2001.10.30), while Dean of Tribunal of the Roman Rota (1985.06.06 – 1993.07.02) and on emeritate; previously Prelate Auditor of Roman Rota (1960.06.23 – 1985.06.06)
- Odilo Pedro Scherer (2001.11.28 – death 2007.03.21) as Auxiliary Bishop of the Roman Catholic Archdiocese of São Paulo (Brazil) (2001.11.28 – 2007.03.21) and Secretary General of National Conference of Bishops of Brazil (2003–2007); later succeeded as Metropolitan Archbishop of São Paulo (2007.03.21 – ...)
- Carmelo Cuttitta (2007.05.28 – 2015.10.07) as Auxiliary Bishop of the Roman Catholic Archdiocese of Palermo (Sicily, Italy) (2007.05.28 – 2015.10.07); later Bishop of the Roman Catholic Diocese of Ragusa (Italy) (2015.10.07 – ...)
- Titular Archbishop Paul Fitzpatrick Russell (2016.03.19 – ...) as papal diplomat: Apostolic Nuncio (ambassador) to Turkey (2016.03.19 – ...); Apostolic Nuncio to Turkmenistan (2016.03.19 – ...); and Apostolic Nuncio to Azerbaijan (2017.04.07 – ...). The Apostolic Nunciature for all three countries is located in Ankara. Previously, he was chargé d'affaires (head of mission) of the Apostolic Nunciature to China, based in Taiwan (2008.05.02 – 2016.03.19).

== Population ==
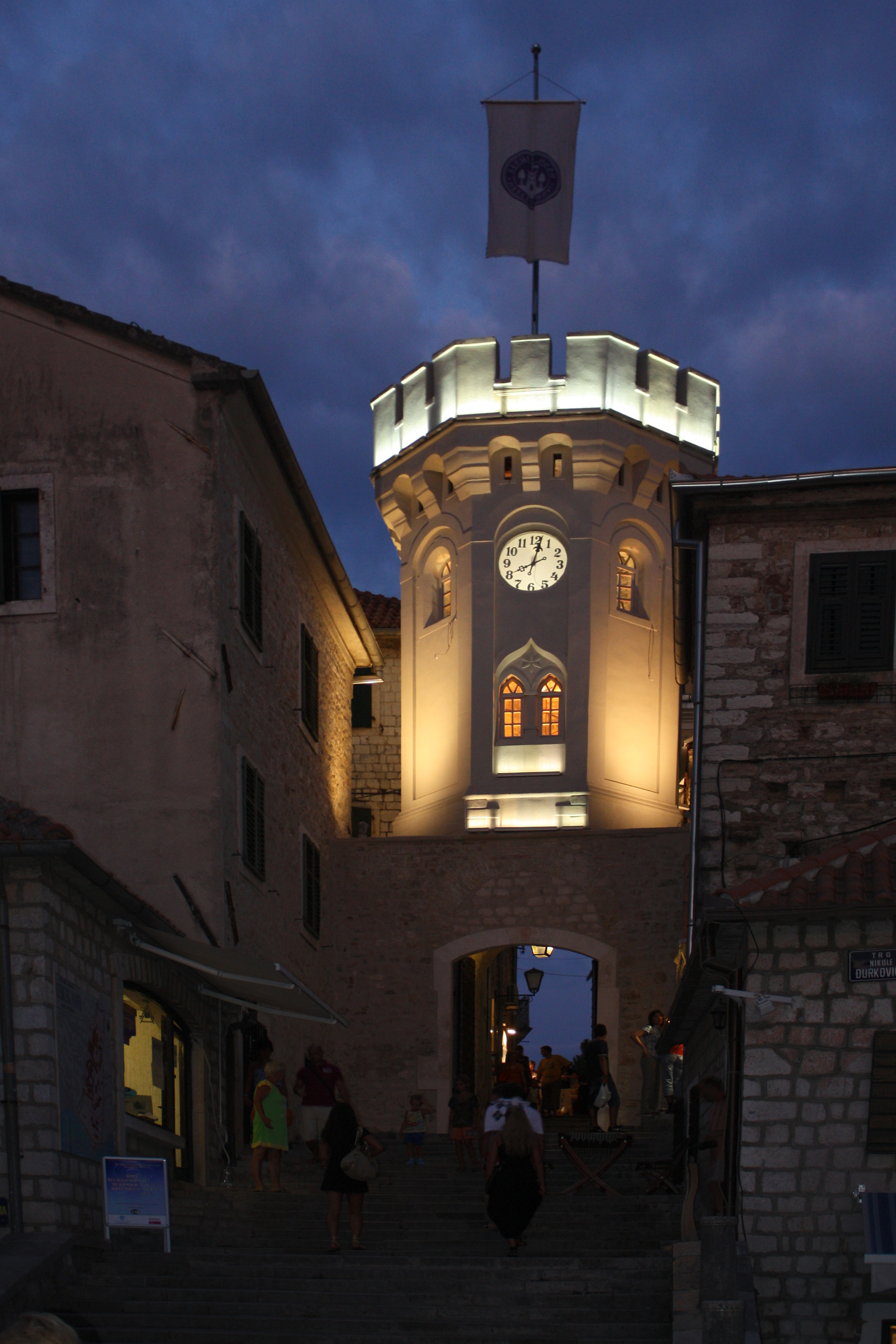
Old town gate at night

Historical population
Year	Pop.	±%
1948	12,482	—
1953	13,759	+10.2%
1961	15,157	+10.2%
1971	18,368	+21.2%
1981	23,258	+26.6%
1991	27,593	+18.6%
2003	33,034	+19.7%
2011	30,864	−6.6%
2023	31,471	+2.0%
Source: pop-stat.mashke.org

The Herceg Novi municipality stretches from Prevlaka to the Verige strait. An almost unbroken string of towns lie along this strip of coast, accommodating the municipality's 30,864 (2011 census) residents.

=== Ethnicity ===
Source: Statistical Office of Montenegro - MONSTAT, Census 2011

Ethnicity	Number	Percentage
Serbs	5,002	45.23%
Montenegrins	4,013	36.28%
Croats	309	2.79%
Yugoslavs	83	0.75%
Bosniaks	63	0.59%
ethnic Muslims	61	0.59%
Romani	46	0.41%
Macedonians	44	0.39%
Russians	44	0.39%
Albanians	21	0.18%
Slovenians	21	0.18%
Hungarians	17	0.15%
Italians	14	0.12%
Other	48	0.43%
not declared	1080	9.76%
Total	11,059	100%

=== Religion ===
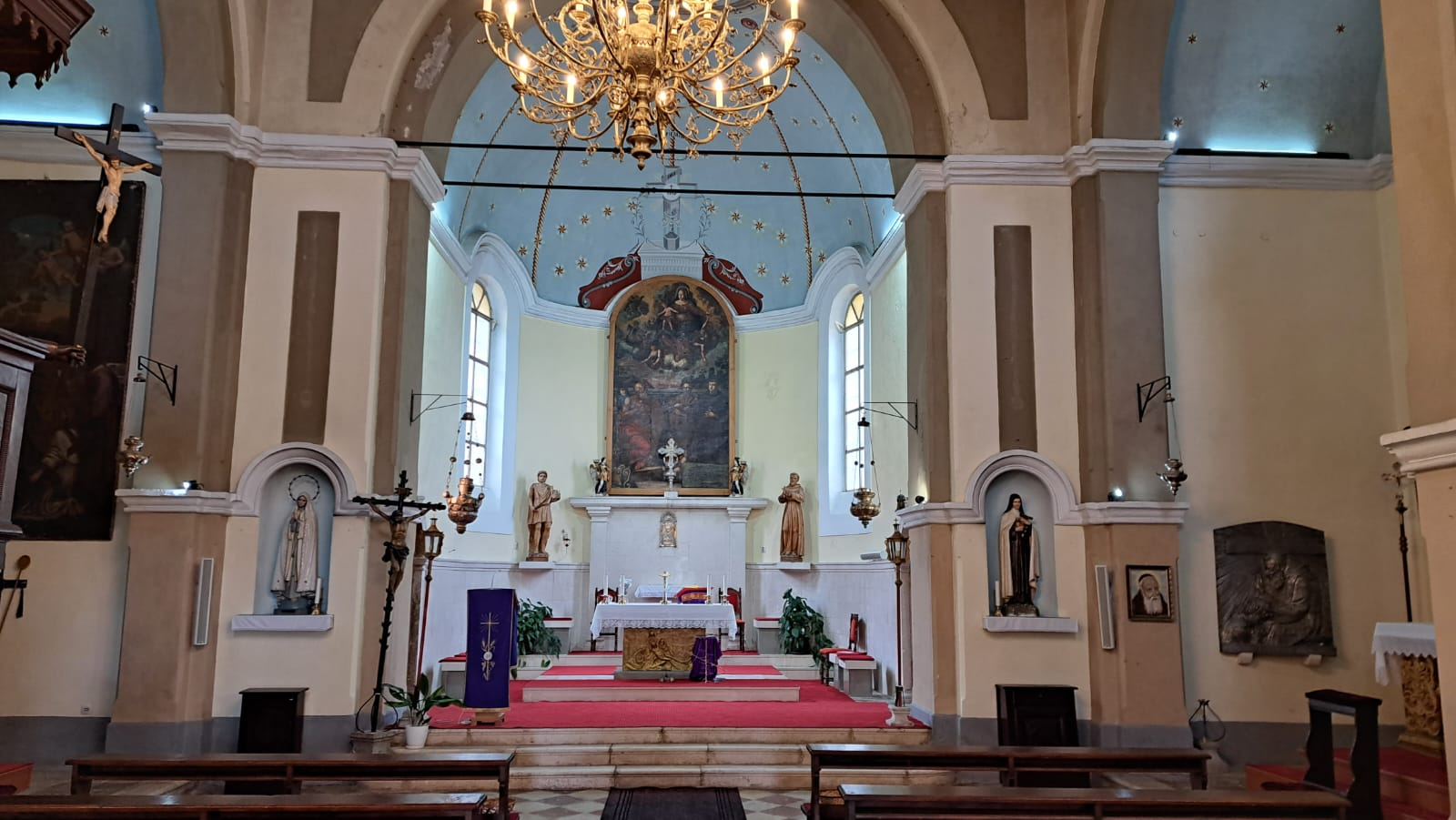
Catholic church of Saint Jerome in Herceg Novi.

Source: Statistical Office of Montenegro - MONSTAT, Census 2011

Religion (2011 census)	Number
Eastern Orthodoxy	8,994
Islam	192
Catholicism	546
Christians	45
Jehovah Witness	0
Buddhist	0
Adventist	19
Agnosticism	37
Atheism	415
Undeclared	738
Other	57

== Tourism ==
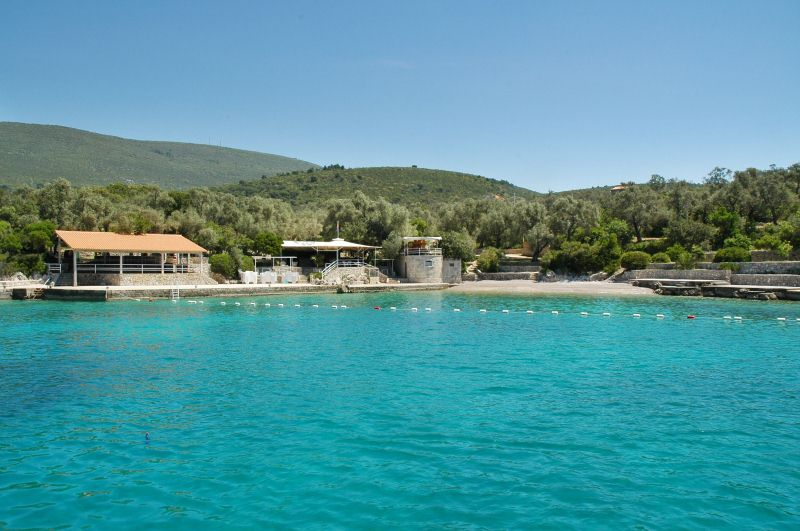
Mirište Beach.

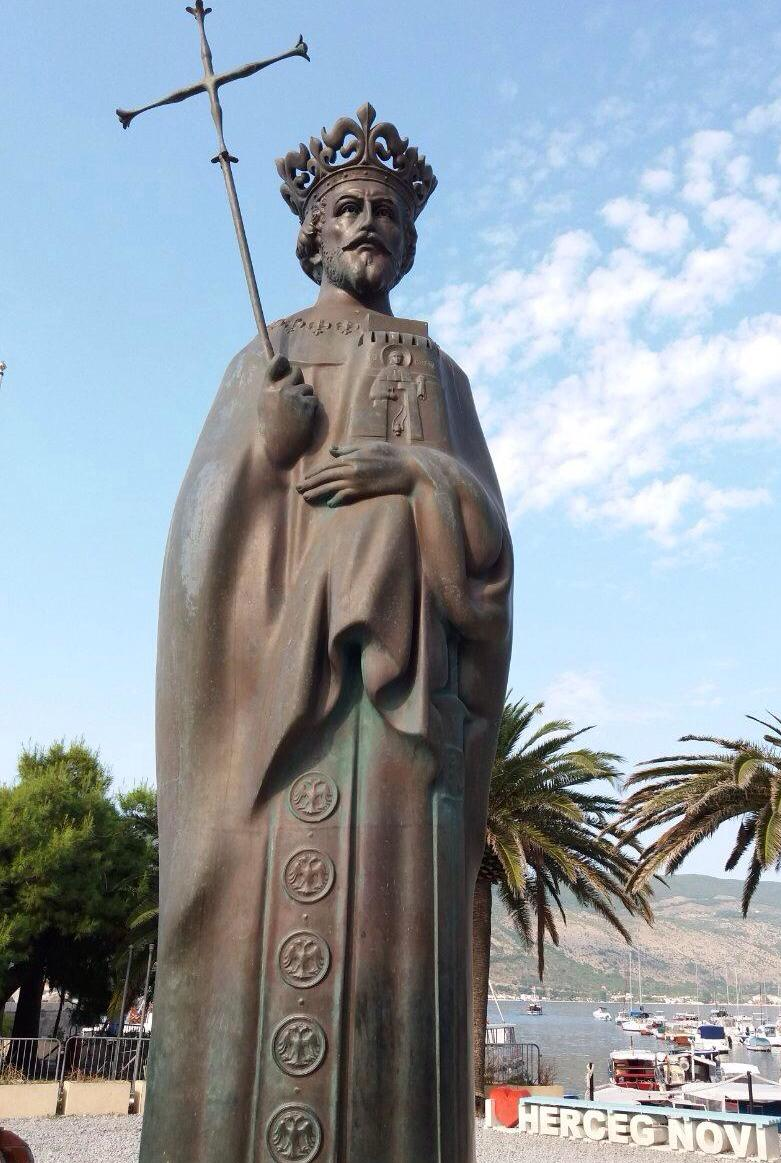
Statue of Tvrtko I of Bosnia in the downtown harbour of Herceg Novi.

Herceg Novi is a major Montenegrin tourist destination. It is well known as a spa and health center; nearby Igalo has an abundance of healing sea mud called "igaljsko blato" (Igalo mud) and mineral springs called "igaljske slatine" (Igalo springs). The most famous tourist attractions in Herceg Novi are castle Forte Mare built by the Bosnian king Tvrtko I in 1382, a clock tower built by Austrians in the 19th century, the Kanli tower built by Turks. Other famous attractions include the various ancient Serbian Orthodox churches and monasteries, which include the Church of St. Ilija, the Church of Preobraženja, the Church of St. Đorđa, the Church of the Holy Salvation (St. Spas), the Church of St. Archangel Michael, and the Savina Monastery.

Whilst the city itself is not a major destination for sunbathing, with no long sandy beaches along the rest of the Bay of Kotor, many beaches are reachable by boat. Tourist companies organise one-day boat trips to Luštica peninsula, which lies opposite to the town. Popular Luštica peninsula beach sites include Žanjic, Mirište and Rose. Herceg Novi accounted for one-third of overnight stays in Montenegro before the Yugoslav wars, but the situation has changed since in favour of Budva, Kotor and other resorts.

Local bus station will charge doubtfully legal fee of €2 for entering its platform with printed e-ticket.

== Culture ==
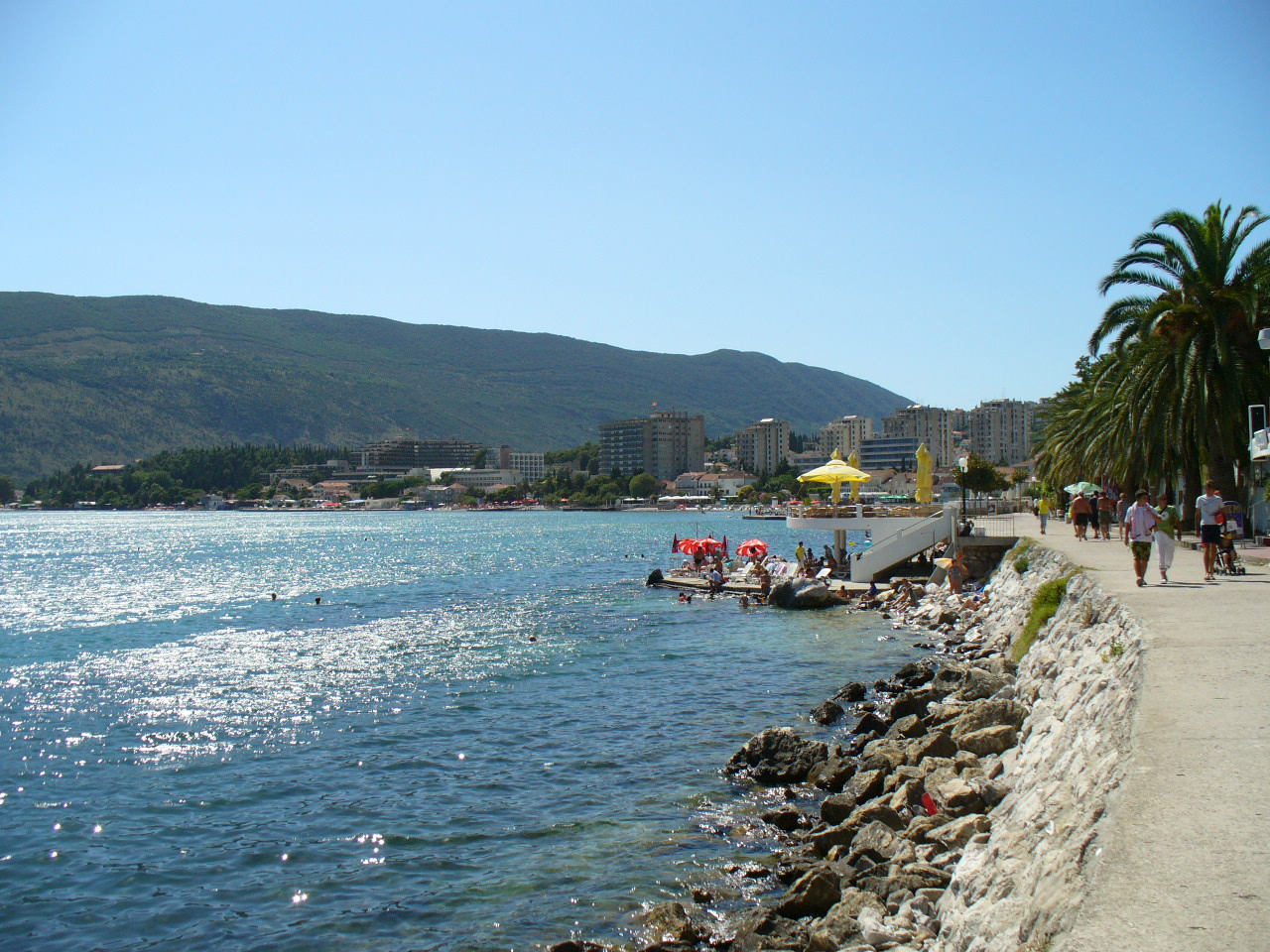
A walkway in Herceg Novi

"JUK Herceg-Fest" This cultural events center was established on 24 February 1992. Two years later the cultural center joined with the "Orijen" movie distribution and production company. Together they have played a crucial role in enhancing the city's cultural life. Among many annual festivities are the mimosa celebration, local theatrical events, and a film and music fest.

"The Operosa Opera Festival" takes place during the summer in the Kanli Kula amphitheater inside the fortress of Stari Grad (Old Town) and in the Forte Mare fortress.

The Herceg Novi City Archive was returned in 1956 the Archive to Herceg Novi after being temporarily relocated to Zadar, Croatia. The Archive was relocated to Zadar by Italians during the Second World War. The original archive building, built in 1885, suffered severe damage from the 1979 earthquake. Shortly afterward, the building was renovated. Today, the Archive is 700 m^{2} (7,535 sq ft) in size. The Archive features modern equipment and a library open to the public. The oldest document in the Archive originated in 1685. The library contains approximately 30,000 volumes and 1,000 periodicals.

The Historical Museum was established in 1949 and officially opened in 1953. The museum building, a gift to the city from the former mayor, Mirko Komnenović (1870–1941), and his wife Olga, is at least 150 years old.

The City library contains at least 30,000 volumes. Among the contributors to this collection are Dušan Petković (5,000 books), Veljka Radojević (1,500), Doklestić, Daljev, Lučić, Subotić and others.

== Transportation ==
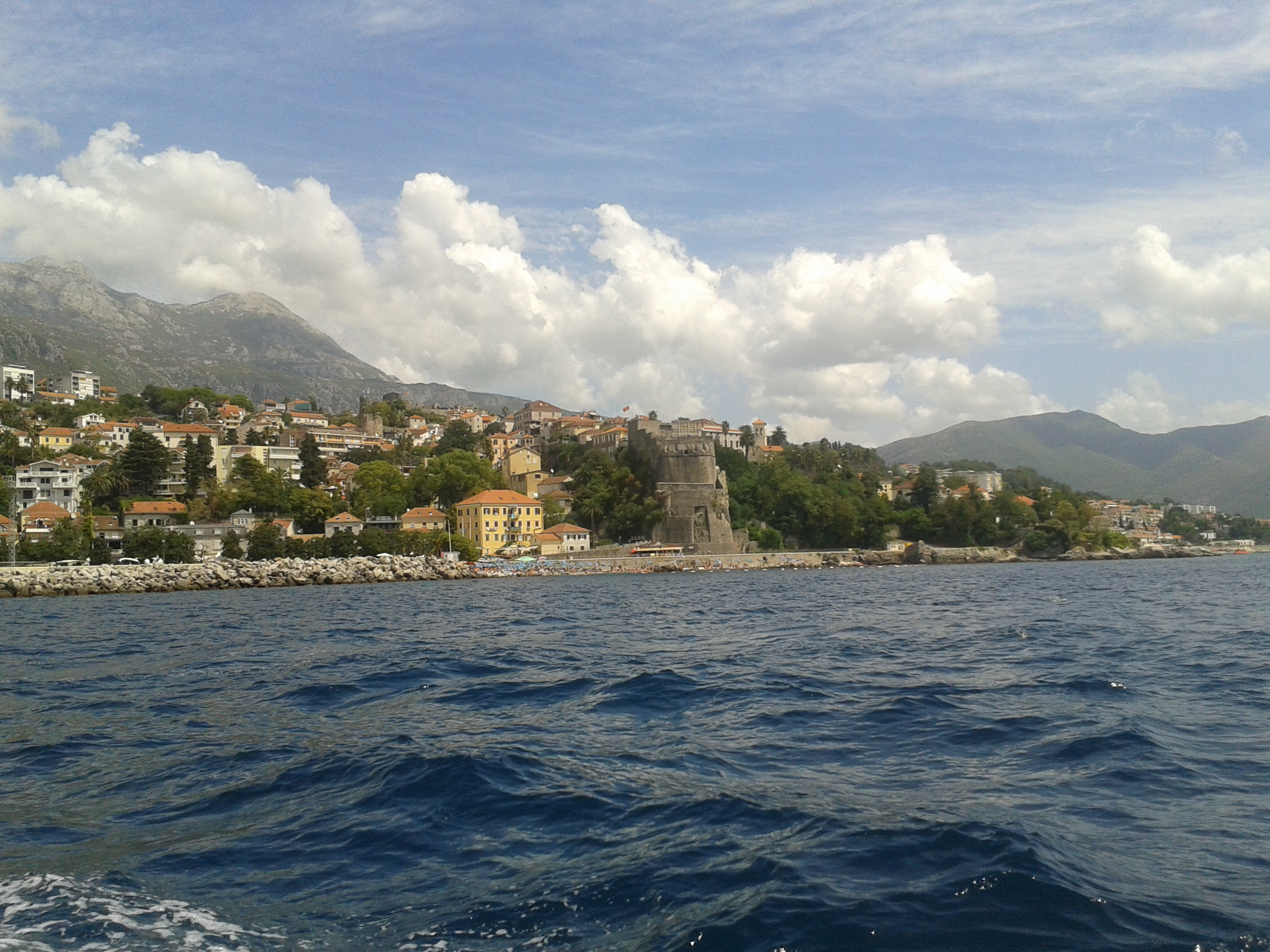
August 2017 panoramic view of Herceg Novi.

Herceg Novi or Igalo is usually the final destination of buses that come from inland Montenegro and Serbia. The Adriatic Motorway, a two-lane motorway that extends for the length of the Montenegrin coast, goes through Herceg Novi before it merges with the Croatian road network at the Debeli Brijeg border crossing.

The ferry operates on the Kamenari – Lepetane line at Verige Strait, eliminating the need to go all the way around Boka Kotorska bay in order to reach Tivat, Kotor, Budva and inland Montenegro.

Tivat Airport is 23 km (14 mi) away (via the ferry). There are regular flights to Belgrade and Zürich, and dozens of charter planes land daily on Tivat airport during the summer season. Dubrovnik Airport in Croatia is some 30 km (19 mi) away, and it maintains regular flights to many European destinations.

== Climate ==
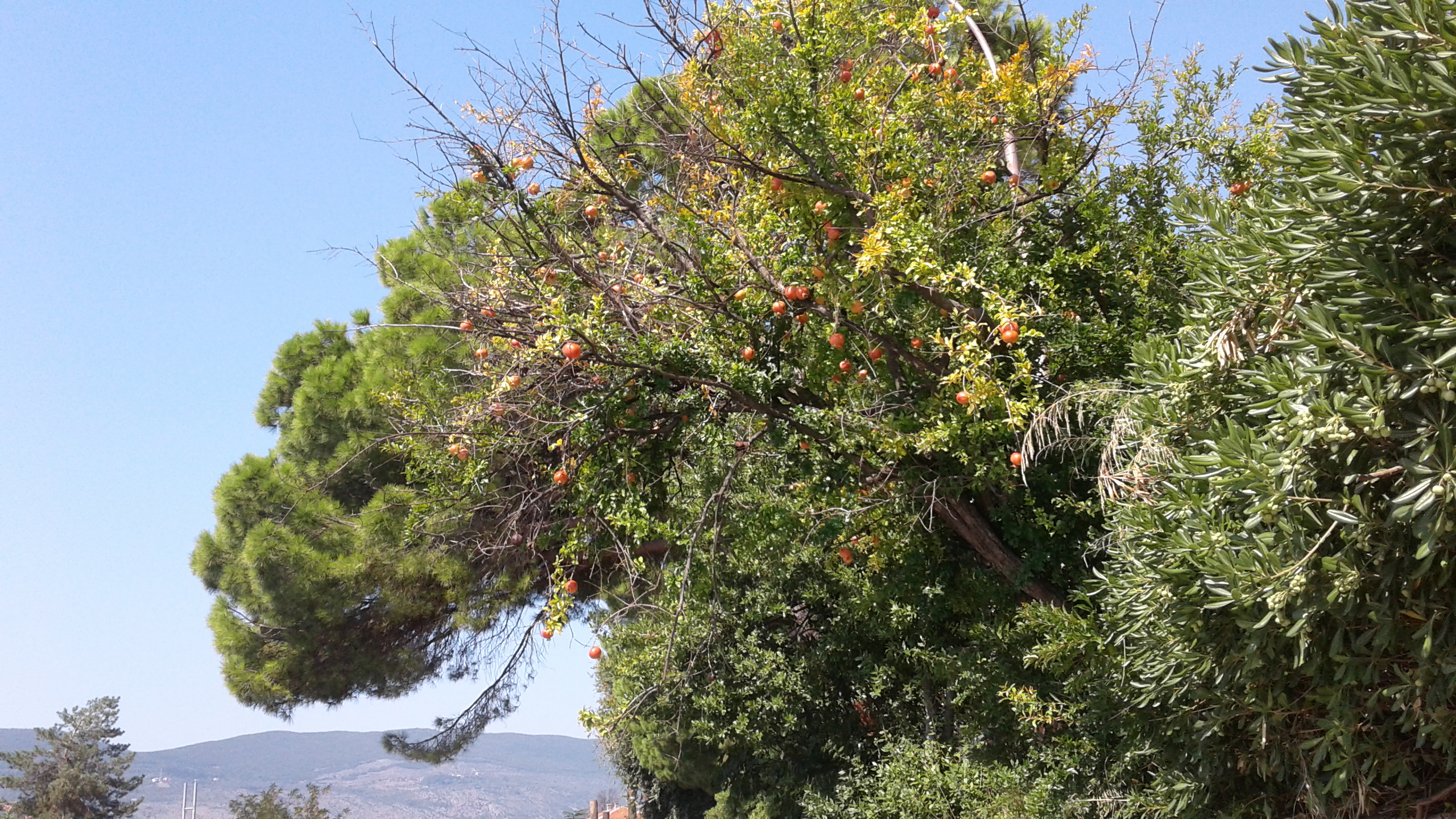
A pomegranate tree near the bus station in Herceg Novi. September 2018.

The area of the Bay of Kotor has a humid subtropical climate (Köppen climate classification: Cfa) with significantly more rain in the winter than in the summer. Herceg Novi has a specific microclimate, which is a result of southern exposition, proximity to the sea, limestone substratum and mountainous hinterland which prevents the breakthrough of cold air masses.

Herceg Novi has approximately 200 sunny days a year. In July and August there are approximately 11 sunny hours per day. Average annual temperature is 16.2 °C (61.2 °F) (similar to that of Naples and Lisbon). There are frequent slight temperature oscillations; the average daily temperature fluctuation is only 4 °C (7.2 °F). Average temperature from May to September is about 25 °C (77 °F), and the average summer sea temperature is rather high, between 22 and 26 °C (72 and 79 °F).

The annual average precipitation is 1,930 mm (76.0 in). Relative air humidity is at its highest level, 80%, in the fall. Its lowest level, 63%, comes in the summer.

Climate data for Herceg Novi (1991–2020, extremes 1948–present)
Month	Jan	Feb	Mar	Apr	May	Jun	Jul	Aug	Sep	Oct	Nov	Dec	Year
Record high °C (°F)	21.4 (70.5)	23.6 (74.5)	27.0 (80.6)	30.2 (86.4)	33.1 (91.6)	36.6 (97.9)	39.2 (102.6)	42.0 (107.6)	35.8 (96.4)	30.9 (87.6)	26.4 (79.5)	21.2 (70.2)	42.0 (107.6)
Mean daily maximum °C (°F)	13.0 (55.4)	13.7 (56.7)	15.9 (60.6)	19.3 (66.7)	23.8 (74.8)	28.3 (82.9)	31.3 (88.3)	31.7 (89.1)	26.9 (80.4)	22.5 (72.5)	17.9 (64.2)	14.0 (57.2)	21.5 (70.7)
Mean daily minimum °C (°F)	4.8 (40.6)	4.8 (40.6)	7.0 (44.6)	9.9 (49.8)	13.9 (57.0)	17.8 (64.0)	20.0 (68.0)	20.6 (69.1)	16.7 (62.1)	13.4 (56.1)	9.7 (49.5)	6.1 (43.0)	12.1 (53.7)
Record low °C (°F)	−7 (19)	−5.6 (21.9)	−3.2 (26.2)	0.0 (32.0)	4.8 (40.6)	9.2 (48.6)	12.0 (53.6)	9.2 (48.6)	7.8 (46.0)	2.0 (35.6)	−3.6 (25.5)	−4 (25)	−7 (19)
Average precipitation mm (inches)	231.3 (9.11)	195.4 (7.69)	198.8 (7.83)	159.2 (6.27)	103.7 (4.08)	63.6 (2.50)	47.3 (1.86)	87.7 (3.45)	151.5 (5.96)	199.2 (7.84)	256.1 (10.08)	235.6 (9.28)	1,929.4 (75.95)
Average precipitation days (≥ 0.1 mm)	14	13	13	12	10	8	6	6	8	10	14	15	129
Average relative humidity (%)	72	70	70	72	73	71	64	66	70	72	75	73	71
Mean monthly sunshine hours	110.5	113.7	160.1	191.6	254.2	288.4	343.0	315.8	249.6	190.1	114.3	101.6	2,432.9
Source 1: Hydrological and Meteorological Service of Montenegro
Source 2: National Oceanic and Atmospheric Administration

== International relations ==
=== Twin towns — Sister cities ===
Herceg Novi is twinned with:

- Bačka Topola, Serbia
- Banja Luka, Bosnia and Herzegovina
- Barletta, Italy
- Beočin, Serbia
- Belgrade, Serbia
- Bitola, North Macedonia
- Čajetina, Serbia
- Centar (Sarajevo), Bosnia and Herzegovina
- Foča, Bosnia and Herzegovina
- Guglionesi, Italy
- Istočno Sarajevo, Bosnia and Herzegovina
- Kotor Varoš, Bosnia and Herzegovina
- Kranj, Slovenia
- Kristiansand, Norway
- Levanger, Norway
- Loznitsa, Bulgaria
- Mali Zvornik, Serbia
- Novo Mesto, Slovenia
- Odesa, Ukraine
- Osijek, Croatia
- Prizren, Kosovo
- Senec, Slovakia
- Szeged, Hungary
- Trebinje, Bosnia and Herzegovina
- Vauréal, France
- Volgorechensk, Russia
- Zemun (Belgrade), Serbia
- Zaječar, Serbia

== Notable residents ==
- Jovan Vavic – former head coach of the USC men's and women's water polo teams

== Bibliography ==
- Ćirković, Sima (1964). Историја средњовековне босанске државе (in Serbo-Croatian). Srpska književna zadruga.
- Ćirković, Sima (1964a). Сугуби венац: прилог историји краљевства у Босни (in Serbo-Croatian). University of Belgrade Faculty of Philosophy.
- Vasić, Milan (2005). Naselja na Balkanskom Poluostrvu od XVI do XVIII Vijeka (in Serbian). Banja Luka: Narodna I Univerzitetska Biblioteka Republike Srpske. ISBN 99938-0-584-X.
- Vego, Marko (1957). Naselja bosanske srednjevjekovne države [Settlements of the Bosnian medieval state] (in Serbo-Croatian). Sarajevo: Svjetlost.

== Sources and external links ==
- Official website of Herceg Novi municipality
- GCatholic – (titular) bishopric
- City Port Herceg Novi
- Weather in Herceg Novi
