= Víctor Maldonado Barreno =

Ecuadorian Roman Catholic bishop (1927–2025)

His Excellency Víctor Maldonado Barreno
- Auxiliary Bishop Emeritus of Guayaquil
- Archdiocese: Guayaquil
- Appointed: February 2, 1990
- Term ended: October 4, 2003
- Other post: Titular Bishop of Ceramussa (1990–2025)

Orders
- Ordination: June 29, 1953
- Consecration: March 3, 1990 by Juan Ignacio Larrea Holguín

Personal details
- Born: February 14, 1927 Alausí Canton, Ecuador
- Died: August 17, 2025 (aged 98) Guayaquil, Ecuador

Víctor Manuel Maldonado Barreno (February 14, 1927 – August 17, 2025) was an Ecuadorian Roman Catholic prelate.

== Life and work ==
Maldonado Barreno was born on February 14, 1927, in the Ecuadorian canton of Alausí. He studied philosophy and theology at the Seminary of Guápulo. He studied ecclesiastical studies at the Pontifical University Antonianum.

He was ordained a priest on June 29, 1953, in Rome. Following his studies in Rome, he was assigned to the Convent of San Francisco in Guayaquil. He was then sent to the Galapagos where he helped establish the Parish of Santa Marianita de Jesús.

On February 2, 1990, Pope John Paul II appointed him titular Bishop of Ceramussa and auxiliary bishop of Guayaquil. He was consecrated on March 3 of the same year, in the Cathedral of Guayaquil, at the hands of Archbishop Juan Larrea Holguín.

On October 4, 2003, Pope John Paul II accepted his resignation as auxiliary bishop. Following his retirement he still maintained a public stance, participating in masses, tributes and other religious ceremonies.

Maldonado Barreno died in the city of Guayaquil, where he resided in a retreat house in the Convent of San Francisco de Guayaquil, on August 17, 2025, at the age of 98.

Catholic Church titles
Preceded by —	Auxiliary Bishop of Guayaquil; 1990–2003	Succeeded by —
Preceded by Augusto Aristizábal Ospina	Titular Bishop of Ceramussa; 1990–2025	Succeeded by Vacant
