= Valter Dario Maggi =

Italian prelate of the Catholic Church (born 1956)

- Bishop Emeritus of Ibarra
- Church: Catholic Church
- Diocese: Diocese of Ibarra
- In office: 25 March 2011 – 13 October 2018
- Predecessor: Julio Terán Dutari
- Successor: René Coba Galarza
- Previous posts: Titular Bishop of Bossa (2008-2011); Auxiliary Bishop of Guayaquil (2008-2011)

Orders
- Ordination: 15 June 1985
- Consecration: 5 April 2008 by Antonio Arregui Yarza

Personal details
- Born: 12 August 1956 (age 70) Brignano Gera d'Adda, Lombardy, Italy

Valter Dario Maggi (born 12 August 1956) is an Italian prelate of the Catholic Church who served more than seven years as the Bishop of Ibarra, Ecuador.

== Biography ==
Valter Dario Maggi was born in Brignano Gera d’Adda on 12 August 1956. He completed his studies in philosophy and theology at the Episcopal Seminary of Bergamo, as a student of the "Paradiso" Missionary Seminary. He was ordained a priest of the Archdiocese of Foggia-Bovino on 15 June 1985. In 1989 he obtained a licentiate in marriage and family theology at the John Paul II Institute in Rome.

In 1992 he went to the Archdiocese of Portoviejo, Ecuador, as a missionary priest and worked as a parish priest while also leading the archdiocese's university ministry. He became secretary of the Education Commission of the Ecuadorian Episcopal Conference.

On 19 February 2008, Pope Benedict XVI named him titular bishop of Bossa and auxiliary bishop of Guayaquil, Ecuador. He received his episcopal ordination on 5 April.

He became a member of the Episcopal Commission for Education and Director of the Pastoral Theological Institute of Ecuador.

Pope Benedict appointed him Bishop of Ibarra on 25 March 2011.

Pope Francis accepted his resignation on 13 October 2018 at the age of 62 to allow him to return to Italy and care for his elderly, infirm parents.
