= Antonio Arregui Yarza =

Ecuadorian Catholic archbishop (1939–2026)

His Excellency Antonio Arregui Yarza
- Archbishop Emeritus of Guayaquil
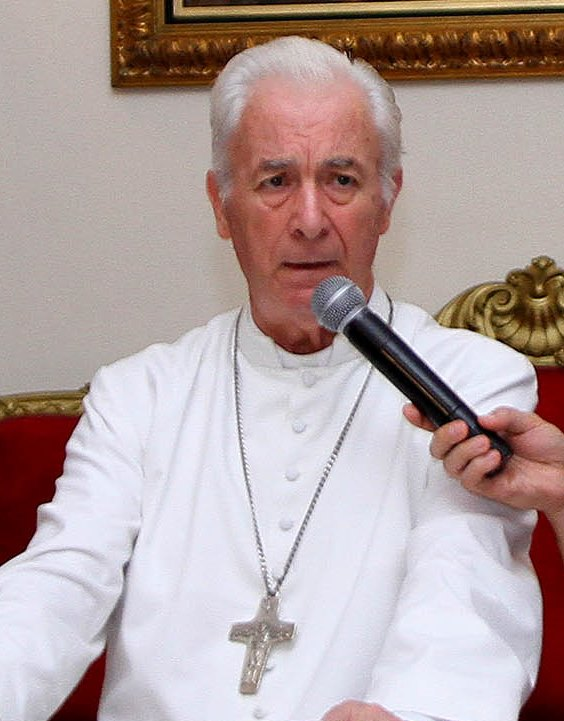
- Arregui in 2015
- Archdiocese: Guayaquil
- Appointed: May 7, 2003
- Term ended: September 24, 2015
- Predecessor: Juan Ignacio Larrea Holguín
- Successor: Luis Cabrera Herrera
- Other post: Apostolic Administrator of Tulcán (2001–2002)
- Previous posts: Auxiliary Bishop of Quito and Titular Bishop of Auzegera (1990–1995); Bishop of Ibarra (1995–2003)

Orders
- Ordination: March 13, 1964
- Consecration: February 22, 1990 by Antonio José González Zumárraga, Juan Ignacio Larrea Holguín and José Mario Ruiz Navas

Personal details
- Born: June 3, 1939 Oñati, Spain
- Died: February 5, 2026 (aged 86) Guayaquil, Ecuador
- Motto: Ipsa Duce
- Coat of arms

Styles of Antonio Arregui Yarza
- Reference style: His Excellency; The Most Reverend
- Spoken style: Your Excellency
- Religious style: Archbishop

Antonio Arregui Yarza (June 3, 1939 – February 5, 2026) was an Ecuadorian Roman Catholic prelate who was the Archbishop Emeritus of Guayaquil in Ecuador.

== Biography ==
Arregui was born in Oñate on June 3, 1939. He was an alumnus of the Pontifical University of St. Thomas Aquinas Angelicum in Rome, where he earned a doctorate in canon Law.

He was Auxiliary Bishop of Quito and Titular Bishop of Auzegera from January 4, 1990, to July 25, 1995.

Arregui served as the Bishop of Ibarra from July 25, 1995, to May 7, 2003.

He was appointed Archbishop of Guayaquil on May 7, 2003, replacing Archbishop Juan Ignacio Larrea Holguín. Arregui retired on September 24, 2015.

As of September 2012, he was the President of the Conferencia Episcopal Ecuatoriana (the Roman Catholic Conference of Bishops of Ecuador).

On September 18, 2012, he was named by Pope Benedict XVI as one of the papally-appointed Synod Fathers for the upcoming October 2012 Ordinary General Assembly of the Synod of Bishops on the New Evangelization.

Arregui died on February 5, 2026, at the age of 86.

== See also ==
- Timeline of Opus Dei

Catholic Church titles
Preceded by Juan Ignacio Larrea Holguín	Archbishop of Guayaquil; 2003–2015	Succeeded by Luis Cabrera Herrera
Preceded by Luis Oswaldo Pérez Calderón	Bishop of Ibarra; 1995–2003	Succeeded by Julio Terán Dutari
Preceded by Pius Suh Awa	Titular Bishop of Auzegera; 1990–1995	Succeeded by Carmelo Echenagusia Uribe
Preceded by —	Auxiliary Bishop of Quito; 1990–1995	Succeeded by —
