= Julio Terán Dutari =

Panamanian-born Ecuadorian academic and Roman Catholic prelate (1933–2026)

- Bishop Emeritus of Ibarra
- Archdiocese: Quito
- Diocese: Ibarra
- Appointed: 14 February 2004
- Term ended: 25 March 2011
- Predecessor: Antonio Arregui Yarza
- Successor: Valter Dario Maggi
- Other post: Apostolic Administrator of Santo Domingo (2012–2015)
- Previous posts: Titular Bishop of Horrea and Auxiliary Bishop of Quito (1995–2004)

Orders
- Ordination: 25 July 1963
- Consecration: 12 July 1995 by Antonio José González Zumárraga, José Mario Ruiz Navas and Luis Enrique Orellana Ricaurte

Personal details
- Born: Julio César Terán Dutari; 15 August 1933 Soná, Panama
- Died: 16 January 2026 (aged 92) Quito, Ecuador
- Occupation: Academic
- Education: Pontifical Catholic University of Ecuador; University of Innsbruck; LMU Munich
- Motto: Fiat mihi
- Coat of arms

Styles of Julio Terán Dutari
- Reference style: His Excellency; The Most Reverend
- Spoken style: Your Excellency
- Religious style: Bishop

Julio César Terán Dutari (15 August 1933 – 16 January 2026) was a Panamanian-born Ecuadorian academic and Roman Catholic prelate. He served as a professor of philosophy and theology at the Pontifical Catholic University of Ecuador from 1973 to 1978, and as the bishop of the Roman Catholic Diocese of Ibarra from 2004 to 2011.

Dutari died in Quito on 16 January 2026, at the age of 92.

Catholic Church titles
Preceded by Antonio Arregui Yarza	Bishop of Ibarra; 2004–2011	Succeeded by Valter Dario Maggi
Preceded by Carlos Stetter	Titular Bishop of Horrea; 1995–2004	Succeeded by Luigi Stucchi
Preceded by —	Auxiliary Bishop of Quito; 1995–2004	Succeeded by —
