= Diocese of San Jacinto =

Roman Catholic diocese in Ecuador

Diocese of San Jacinto Dioecesis Sancti Hyacinthi Diócesis de San Jacinto

Catholic
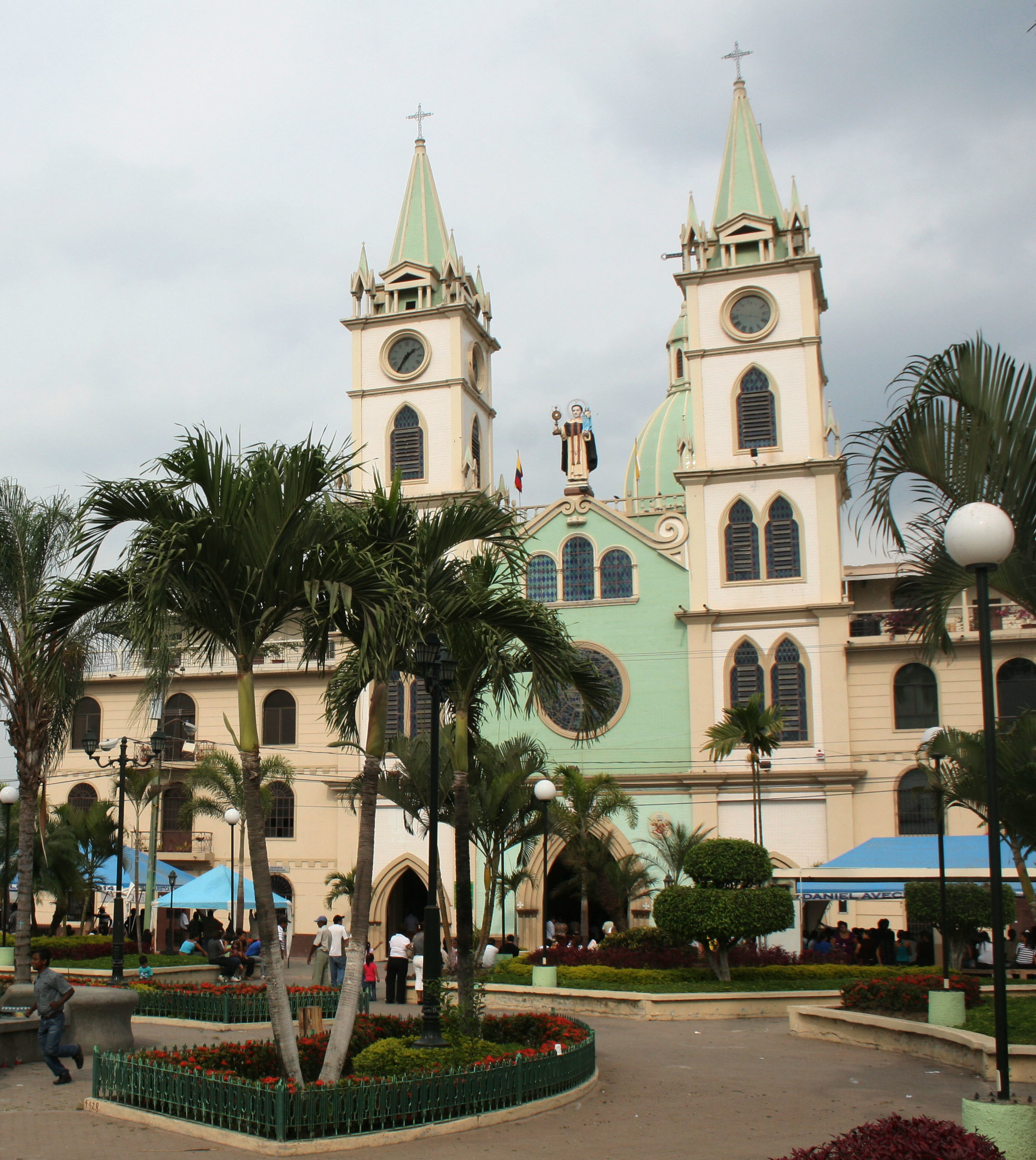
- Cathedral-Basilica of St. Hyancinth

Location
- Country: Ecuador
- Metropolitan: Archdiocese of Guayaquil
- Headquarters: Durán, Guayas Province, Ecuador

Statistics
- Area: 6,265 km^{2} (2,419 sq mi)
- Population: Total; Catholics: (as of 2022); 814,125; 729,816 (89.6%)
- Parishes: 48

Information
- Denomination: Catholic Church
- Sui iuris church: Latin Church
- Rite: Roman Rite
- Established: 4 November 2009; 16 years ago
- Cathedral: Catedral basílica de San Jacinto
- Secular priests: 50 (35 Diocesan, 12 Religious Orders)

Current leadership
- Pope: Leo XIV
- Bishop: Gustavo Rosales Escobar
- Metropolitan Archbishop: Luis Cabrera Herrera, O.F.M.
- Bishops emeritus: Aníbal Nieto Guerra, O.C.D.

The Roman Catholic Diocese of San Jacinto (Latin: Dioecesis Sancti Hyacinthi de Yaguachi) is located in the town of Yaguachi, Ecuador. It is a suffragan see to the Archdiocese of Guayaquil.

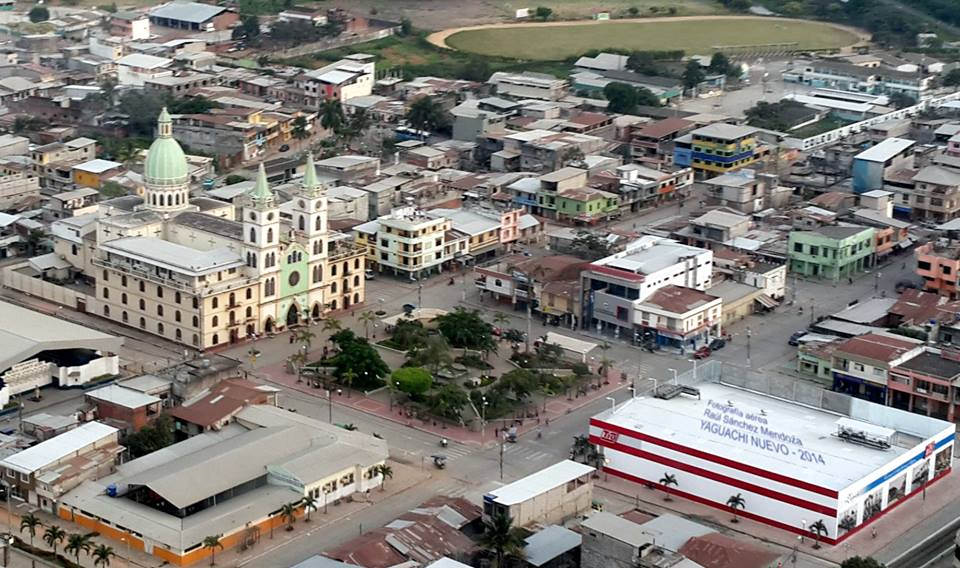
View of the Central Park and the Cathedral Basilica in Yaguachi

== History ==
On 4 November 2009, Pope Benedict XVI established the Diocese of San Jacinto de Yaguachi from the Archdiocese of Guayaquil.

== Ordinaries ==
- Aníbal Nieto Guerra, O.C.D. (4 November 2009 – 31 January 2025), retired
- Gustavo Rosales Escobar (31 January 2025 – Present)
