= Juan Ignacio Larrea Holguín =

Argentinian lawyer and archbishop

Servant of God Juan Ignacio Larrea Holguín
- Archbishop Emeritus of Guayaquil
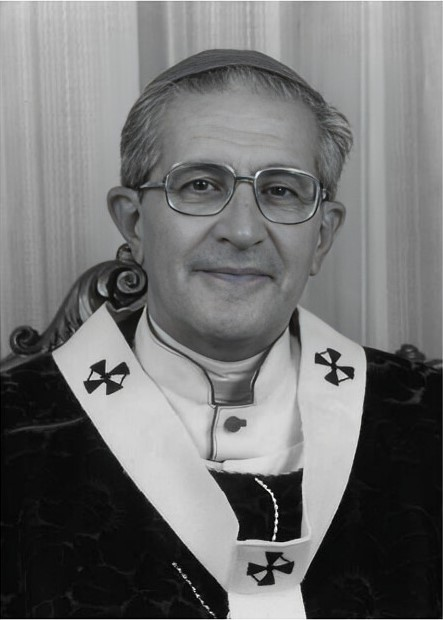
- Church: Roman Catholic Church
- Archdiocese: Guayaquil
- See: Guayaquil
- Appointed: 7 December 1989
- Installed: 7 December 1989
- Term ended: 7 May 2003
- Predecessor: Bernardino Carlos Guillermo Honorato Echeverría Ruiz, O.F.M.
- Successor: Antonio Arregui Yarza
- Other posts: Auxiliary Bishop of Quito (1969 - 1980); Titular Bishop of Cellae in Proconsulari (1969 - 1980); Bishop of Ibarra (1980 - 1983); Titular Bishop of Novi (1983 - 1988); Bishop of the Military Ordinariate of Ecuador (1983 - 1989); Coadjutor Archbishop of Guayaquil (1988 - 1989)

Orders
- Ordination: 5 August 1962 by Pope John XXIII
- Consecration: 15 June 1969 by Cardinal Pablo Muñoz Vega
- Rank: Archbishop

Personal details
- Born: 10 August 1927 Buenos Aires, Argentina
- Died: 27 August 2006 (aged 79) Quito, Ecuador
- Profession: Lawyer
- Education: Pontificia Universidad Católica del Ecuador; Pontifical University of Saint Thomas Aquinas of Rome; Sapienza University of Rome

Juan Ignacio Larrea Holguín (August 10, 1927 – August 27, 2006), was archbishop of Guayaquil for ten years, and the first member of the prelature of Opus Dei in Ecuador. He was also a distinguished lawyer, frequently consulted about Ecuadorian Civil law and the author of more than 60 books about jurisprudence.

== Biography ==
Larrea Holguín was born in Buenos Aires, Argentina, while his father performed a diplomatic service for Ecuador before the Argentine government. He received his primary and secondary education in Ecuador (La Salle school), Peru and Argentina, and was a founding student of the Pontificia Universidad Católica del Ecuador (PUCE), where he studied law. He continued his legal education in Italy, where he acquired the degree of Doctor in Law. Returning to Ecuador, he obtained the Doctorate in Law from the Pontifical Catholic University of Ecuador.

As a student in Italy, Larrea Holguín met Josemaría Escrivá de Balaguer, founder of Opus Dei, and after this meeting, in 1949, he requested admission into this institution of the Catholic Church. Owing to this, he became the first member of Opus Dei in Ecuador in 1952. He later received a Doctorate in Canon Law from the Angelicum of Rome, and was ordained a Catholic priest in 1962.

Pope Paul VI appointed him auxiliary bishop of Quito in 1969, and in 1975 he was transferred to the diocese of Ibarra. In 1983, Pope John Paul II appointed him the first military bishop of Ecuador and in 1988 he moved him to Guayaquil, where he served as Archbishop from 1989. John Paul II accepted Holguín's resignation from episcopal duties in 2003, when Holguín was aged 75. Since his retirement, he dedicated himself to the service of Opus Dei, and to the creation of numerous religious and legal works. He died of a long illness that he suffered since 1996.

== Career ==
Holguín was a professor in various Ecuadorian universities, including the Catholic University of Guayaquil and Central University of Ecuador. He held the chair in Civil law at the Catholic University of Quito for many years. He also educated people in the Institute of High National Studies, the Academy of Diplomacy and seminaries of Ibarra and Guayaquil.

He was vice-president of the Electoral Supreme Court and adviser for the Presidency of the Republic, the Supreme Court of Justice and the Ministry of Agriculture. He was a member of both the Ecuadorian delegation to the Conference of Chancellors of Santiago of Chile and the Commission for Constitutional Reforms that drafted the new Ecuadorian Constitution of 1998. In addition, he was on the advisory board of foreign affairs and in the academies for history and language. He was a lawyer of the Ecuadorian Institute of Social Security and of the Supreme Electoral Court.

== Honours ==
- Honorary Doctorate degree of the Catholic University of Guayaquil
- The "Tobar" prize from the municipality of Quito
- The national "Eugenio Espejo" prize of Ecuador
- Honorary Doctorate degree of the Hemisferios University (post mortem)

== Legacy ==
Holguín promoted the process of beatification and canonization of Narcisa de Nobol. In 1980 he founded the seminary of Ibarra, which has created more than 120 priests. He fostered the creation of a tenement for more than 5,000 families of the Imbabura Province. As Military Bishop, he structured the religious service of the Military of Ecuador. His pastoral work was exhaustive, preaching numerous spiritual retirements, visiting the parishes of his dioceses and overseeing the work of the dioceses' seminaries.

== Notable works ==
- Enciclopedia Jurídica Ecuatoriana (Ecuadorian Legal Encyclopedia)
- Manual elemental de derecho civil del Ecuador (Elemental Manual of Ecuadorian Civil Law)
- Manual de Derecho Internacional Privado Ecuatoriano (Manual of Ecuadorian Private International Law)
- 145 Años de Legislación (145 Years of Legislation)
- Repertorios de Jurisprudencia (Repertoires of Jurisprudence)
- Derecho Eclesiástico Ecuatoriano (Ecuadorian Ecclesiastic Law)
- Novena a San Josemaría Escrivá (Novena to Saint Josemaría Escrivá)
- Novena a Juan Pablo II (Novena to John Paul II)
- Novena a Monseñor Álvaro del Portillo (Novena to Monsignor Álvaro del Portillo)

== See also ==
- Timeline of Opus Dei
