= Sacra Famiglia di Nazareth a Centocelle =

- Church of the Holy Family of Nazareth at Centocelle
- Tempio Parrocchiale Sacra Famiglia di Nazareth
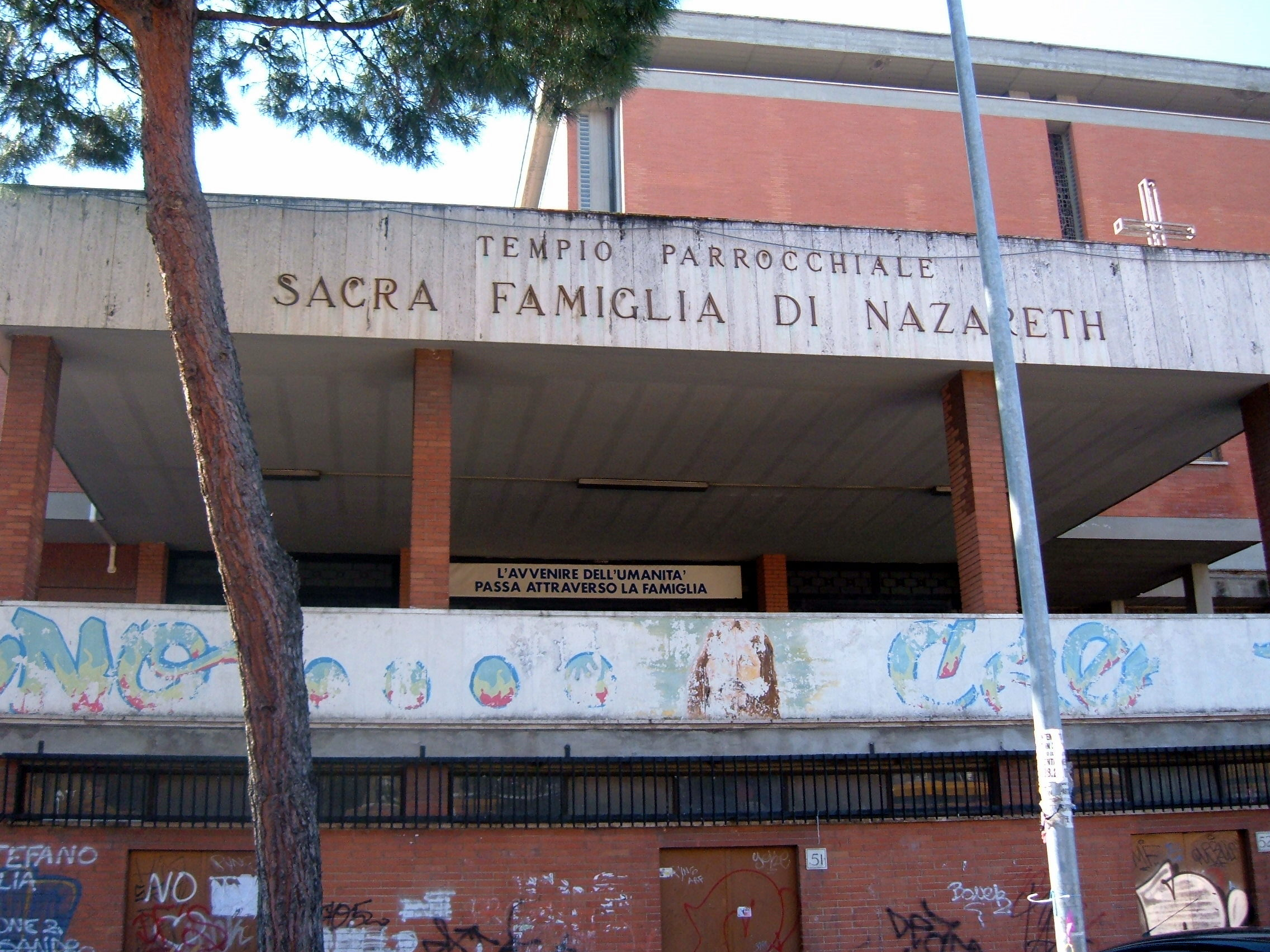
- Entrance

- Location within Rome
- 41°53′08″N 12°33′42″E
- Location: Piazzale delle Gardenie 45, Prenestino-Centocelle, Rome
- Country: Italy
- Language: Italian
- Denomination: Catholic
- Tradition: Roman Rite
- Website: www.facebook.com/SacraFamigliaRoma

History
- Status: titular church, parish church
- Dedication: Holy Family
- Consecrated: 1972

Architecture
- Functional status: active
- Architect: Mario Fusacchia
- Architectural type: Modern
- Groundbreaking: 1970
- Completed: 1972

Administration
- Diocese: Rome

Sacra Famiglia di Nazareth a Centocelle is a 20th-century parochial church and titular church in eastern Rome, dedicated to the Holy Family.

== History ==
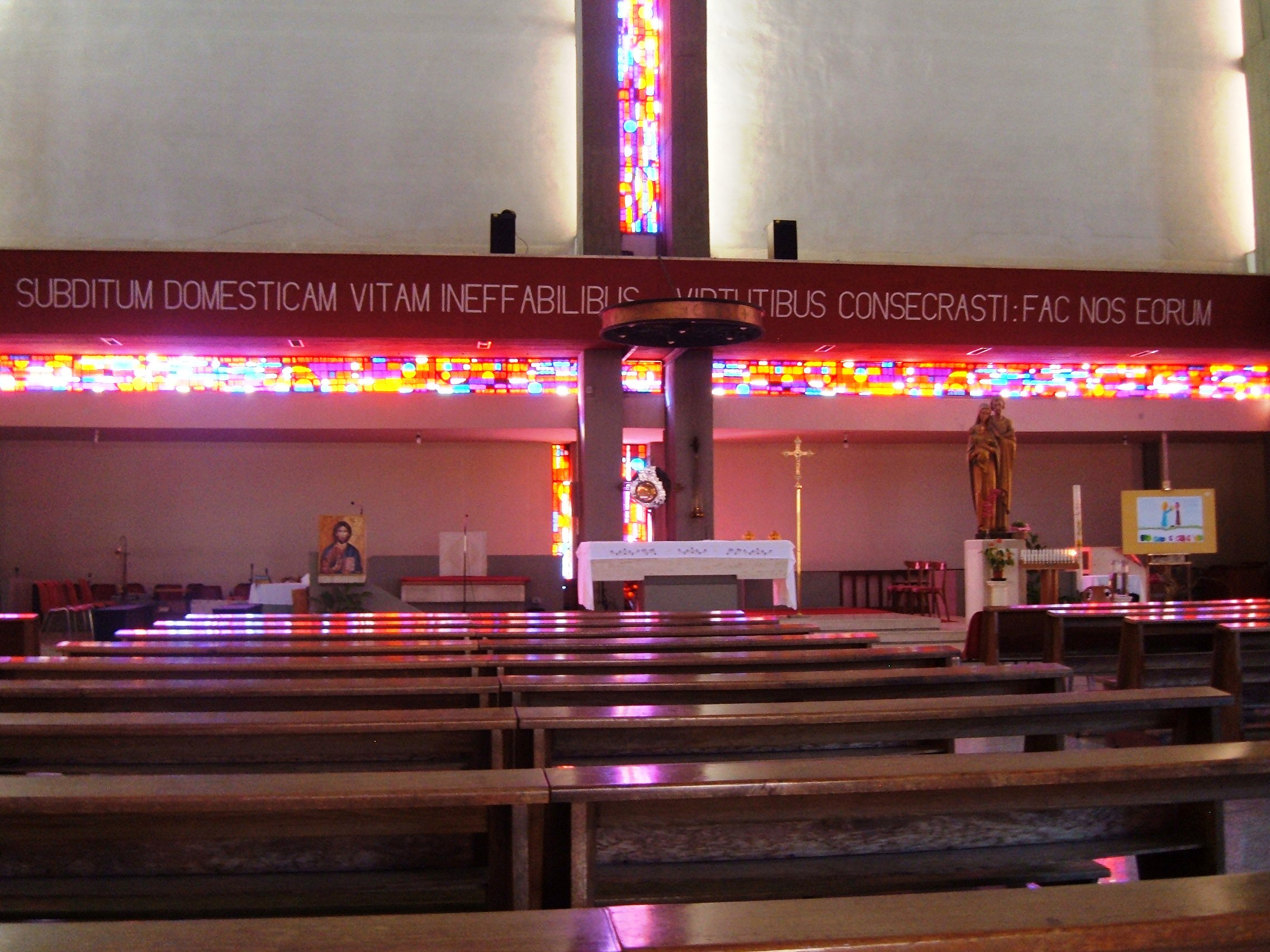
Interior. The Latin frieze reads, Omnipotens aeterne Deus, qui per filium tuum Jesum Christum Mariae et Joseph subditum domesticam vitam ineffabilis virtutibus consecrasti, fac nos eorum auxilio familiae sanctae exemplis instrui et consortium consequi sempiternum. Laudetur sacra familia. ("Almighty eternal God, who consecrated domestic life with unutterable virtues through your son Jesus Christ being subject to Mary and Joseph, by their help make us models of the holy family and sharers in eternal fellowship. May the holy family be praised.")

The church was built in 1970–72 to a design by Mario Fusacchia.

On 7 December 2024, Pope Francis made it a titular church to be held by a cardinal-priest.

Cardinal-protectors

- Luis Cabrera Herrera (2024 – present)
