= Diocese of Santa Elena =

Roman Catholic diocese in Ecuador

Diocese of Santa Elena Dioecesis Sanctae Helenae
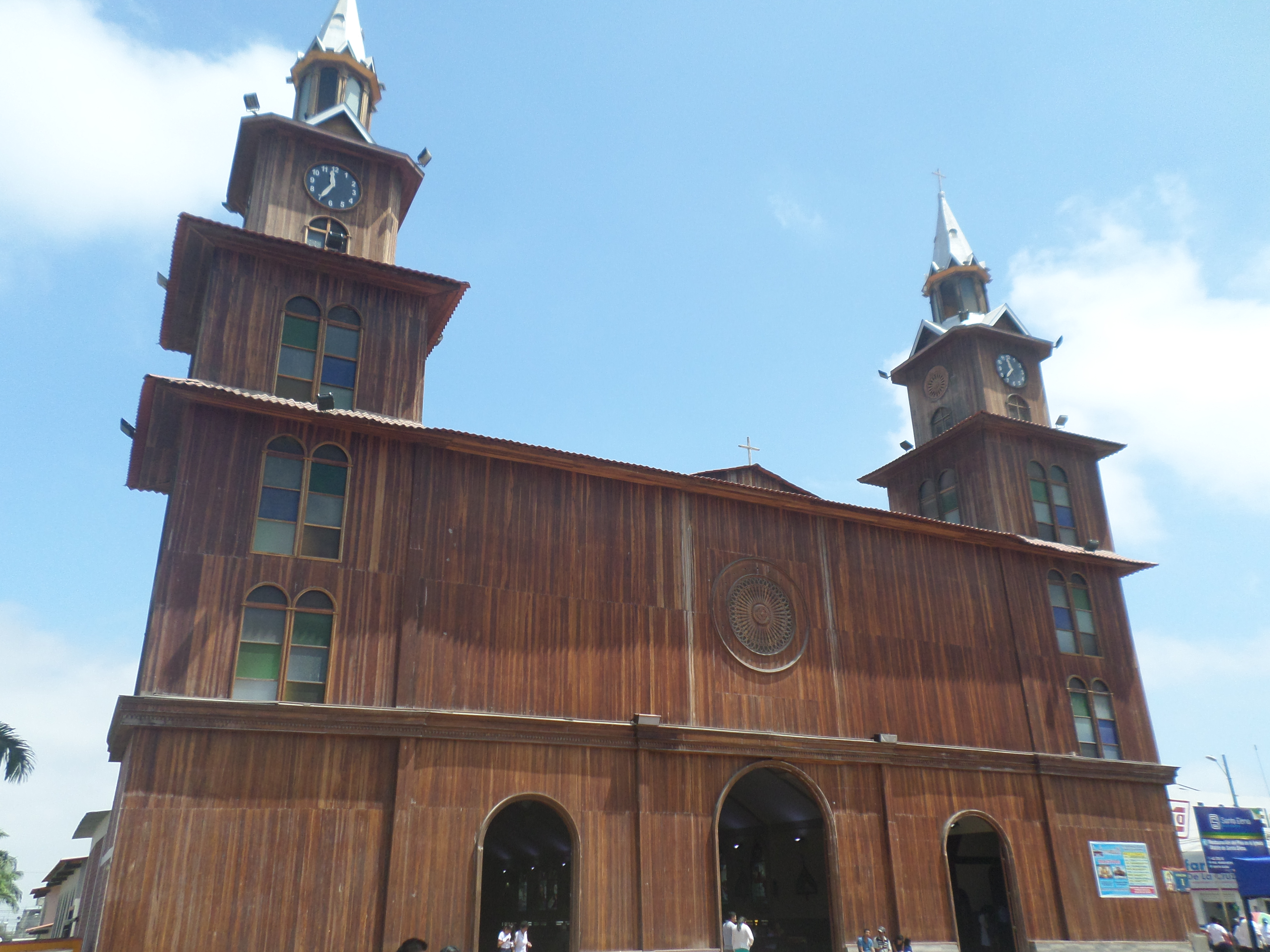
- Cathedral of the St. Helen in Santa Elena

Location
- Country: Ecuador
- Ecclesiastical province: Guayaquil

Statistics
- Area: 6,343.38 km^{2} (2,449.19 sq mi)
- Population: Total; Catholics: (as of 2022); 400,000; 340,000 (85%)
- Parishes: 28

Information
- Rite: Latin Rite
- Established: 2 February 2022 (3 years ago)
- Cathedral: Cathedral of the St. Helen in Santa Elena
- Secular priests: 43

Current leadership
- Pope: Leo XIV
- Bishop: Guido Iván Minda Chalá

The Roman Catholic Diocese of Santa Elena (Latin: Dioecesis Sanctae Helenae) is a diocese located in the town of Santa Elena in the ecclesiastical province of Guayaquil in Ecuador.

== Diocese ==
The diocese covers an area of the 3 cantons in the Santa Elena Province: Santa Elena, La Libertad, Salinas and also the territories, that belong to the Guayas Province: Playas Canton and the localities El Morro, Posorja and Progreso.

It's divided into 28 parishes and has 29 diocesan and 14 religious priests as per 2022.

== History ==
On 2 February 2022, Pope Francis established the Diocese of Santa Helena, when it was split off from the Roman Catholic Archdiocese of Guayaquil.

== Ordinaries ==
- Guido Iván Minda Chalá (since 2 February 2022)

== See also ==
- Roman Catholicism in Ecuador
