= Luis Cabrera Herrera =

Roman Catholic Archbishop of Guayaquil

His Eminence Luis Gerardo Cabrera OFM
- Cardinal; Archbishop of Guayaquil
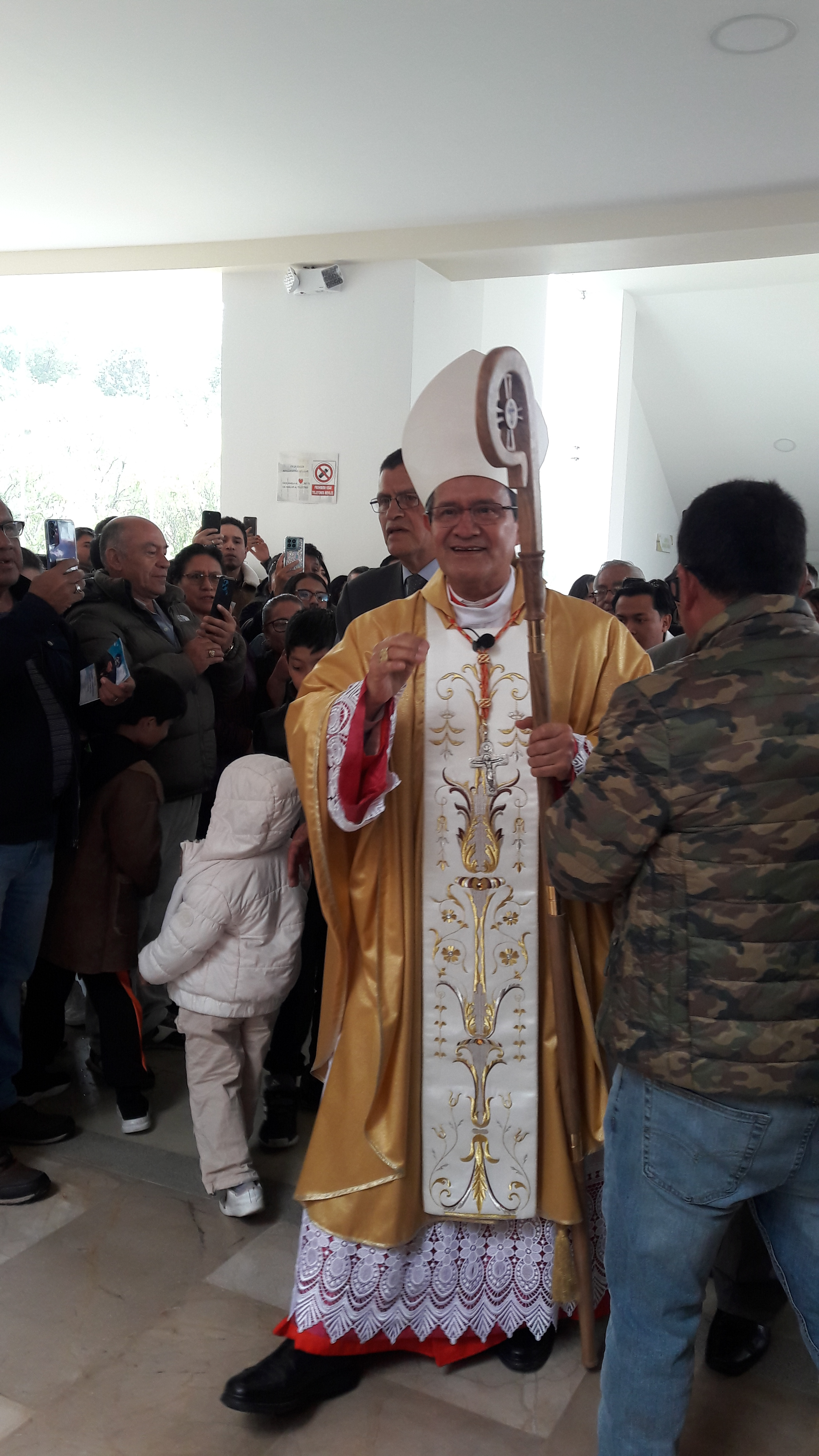
- Church: Catholic Church
- Appointed: 20 April 2009
- Predecessor: Antonio Arregui
- Other post: Cardinal-Priest of Sacra Famiglia di Nazareth a Centocelle (2024–)
- Previous post: Archbishop of Cuenca (2009–15)

Orders
- Ordination: 8 September 1983 by Serafín Cartagena Ocaña
- Consecration: 4 July 2009 by Giacomo Guido Ottonello
- Created cardinal: 7 December 2024 by Pope Francis
- Rank: Cardinal-Priest

Personal details
- Born: 11 October 1955 (age 70) Azogues, Ecuador
- Motto: Verbum Domini Nuntiantes
- Coat of arms

Luis Gerardo Cabrera Herrera, OFM (born 11 October 1955), is an Ecuadorian prelate of the Catholic Church who has been Archbishop of Guayaquil since 2015. He was Archbishop of Cuenca from 2009 to 2015. He has been president of the Ecuadorian Episcopal Conference since 2020, having served as its vice president from 2011 to 2014 and from 2017 to 2020. On 7 December 2024, Pope Francis made Cabrera a cardinal.

== Biography ==
=== Early years ===
Luis Cabrera Herrera was born on 11 October 1955 in Azogues. He studied at the Franciscan minor seminaries there and in Quito, followed by philosophy and theology at the Pontifical Catholic University of Ecuador. He earned his doctorate in philosophy at the Pontifical Antonianum University in Rome.

On 1 October 1975, he entered the novitiate of the Order of Friars Minor in Quito. He made his first profession of vows on 24 September 1976 and took his solemn vows on 4 September 1982 in Quito. He was ordained a priest on 8 September 1983 by Bishop Serafín Cartagena Ocaña, Vicar Apostolic of Zamora, a Franciscan.

He fulfilled these assignments for the Franciscans in Ecuador: vice-master of novices from 1983 to 1985; member of the Provincial Council from 1985 to 1988; master of novices from 1985 to 1990; secretary for studies and formation from 1995 to 2000; head of Vocation Ministry for Ecuador; director of the Franciscan Studies Center of Ecuador from 1996 to 2001; director of the Cardinal Bernardino Echeverría Philosophical-Theological Institute in Quito, and professor of Franciscan theology and spirituality from 1998 to 2000; provincial of the Franciscans in Ecuador from 2000 to 2003. He was also Executive Secretary of the Ecumenism Commission of the EEC from 1996 to 2003. Based in Rome, he served as general councilor of the Order of Friars Minor with responsibility for the Franciscan provinces of Latin America and the Caribbean from 2004 to 2009.

=== Archbishop and cardinal ===
On 20 April 2009, Pope Benedict XVI appointed him Archbishop of Cuenca.

He received his episcopal consecration on 4 July from Archbishop Giacomo Guido Ottonello, Apostolic Nuncio to Ecuador.

He was vice president of the EEC from 2011 to 2014. He was president of the EEC's Commission for the Laity of Lay People from 2014 to 2017.

On 24 September 2015, Pope Francis appointed him Archbishop of Guayaquil. He was installed there on 5 December.

On 28 May 2019, he was named a member of the Congregation for Institutes of Consecrated Life and Societies of Apostolic Life.

He served as apostolic administrator of the Diocese of Daule from 17 March 2022 to 25 June 2023.

He was vice president of the EEC from 2017 to 2020. During his term, he played a crucial role in promoting dialogue and peace promoted by the Catholic Church, especially in the demonstrations of 2019. He has been elected to a three-year term as president of the ECC twice, on 10 November 2020 and 7 November 2023.

On 7 July 2023, Pope Francis named him one of the delegate presidents of the first session of the Synod on Synodality.

On 6 October 2024, Pope Francis announced he planned to make Cabrera a cardinal on 8 December, a date that was later changed to 7 December. He is the sixth Ecuadorian to be named a cardinal. and the first from Guayaquil while the others were from Quito. Cabrera expects to remain in Guayaquil as cardinal.

On 7 December 2024, Pope Francis made him a cardinal, assigning him as a member of the order of cardinal priests with the title of Sacra Famiglia di Nazareth a Centocelle.

He participated as a cardinal elector in the 2025 papal conclave that elected Pope Leo XIV.

== See also ==
- Catholic Church in Ecuador
- Cardinals created by Pope Francis
