= Archdiocese of Guayaquil =

Roman Catholic archdiocese in Ecuador

Coordinates: 2.1947°S 79.8837°W

Archdiocese of Guayaquil Archidioecesis Guayaquilensis

Catholic
- Cathedral of St. Peter

Location
- Country: Ecuador
- Ecclesiastical province: Province of Guayaquil

Statistics
- Area: 2,291.77 km^{2} (884.86 sq mi)
- Population: Total; Catholics: (as of 2022); 2,630,000; 2,234,000 (84.9%)
- Parishes: 164

Information
- Denomination: Roman Catholic
- Rite: Latin Rite
- Established: 29 January 1838 (Erected as Diocese); 22 January 1956 (Elevated to Archdiocese)
- Cathedral: Catedral San Pedro
- Secular priests: 285

Current leadership
- Pope: Leo XIV
- Archbishop: Luis Cabrera Herrera
- Auxiliary Bishops: Gerardo Miguel Nieves Loja
- Bishops emeritus: Antonio Arregui Yarza

Map
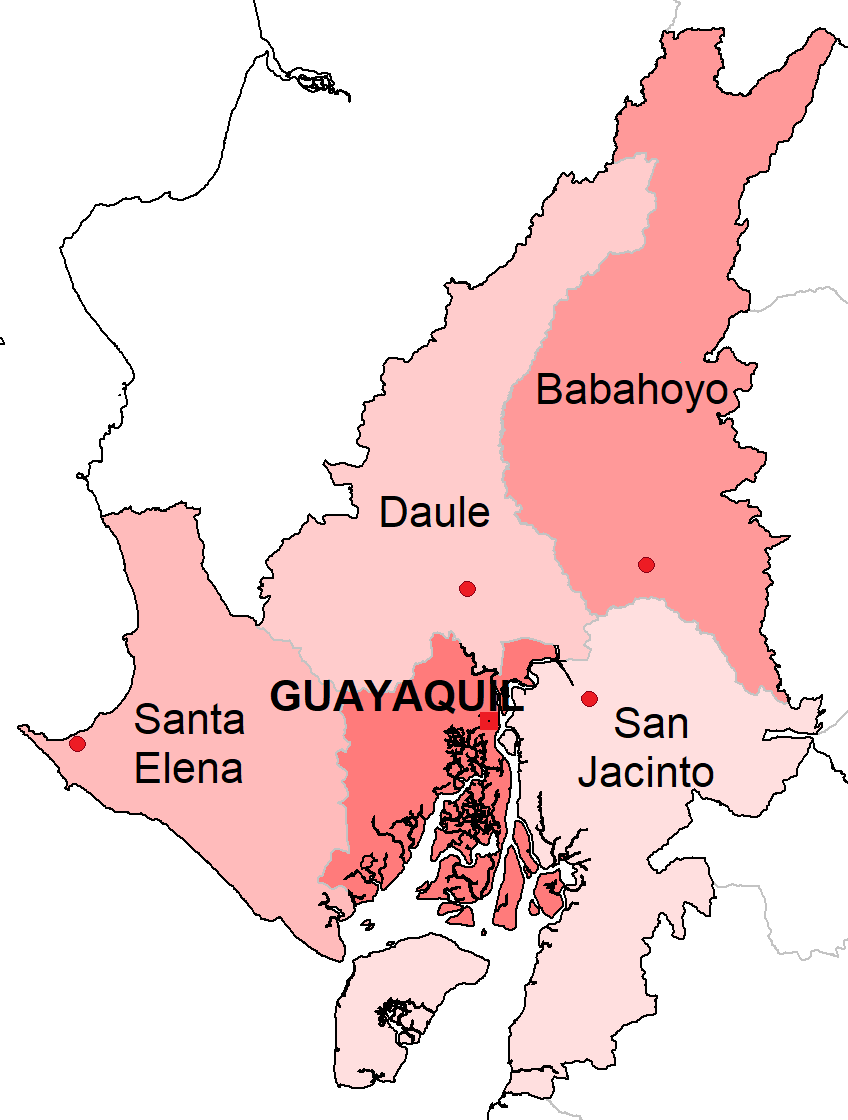

Website
- arquidiocesisdeguayaquil.org.ec

The Roman Catholic Metropolitan Archdiocese of Guayaquil (Latin: Archidioecesis Guayaquilensis) is an archdiocese located in the city of Guayaquil in Ecuador.

== Special churches ==
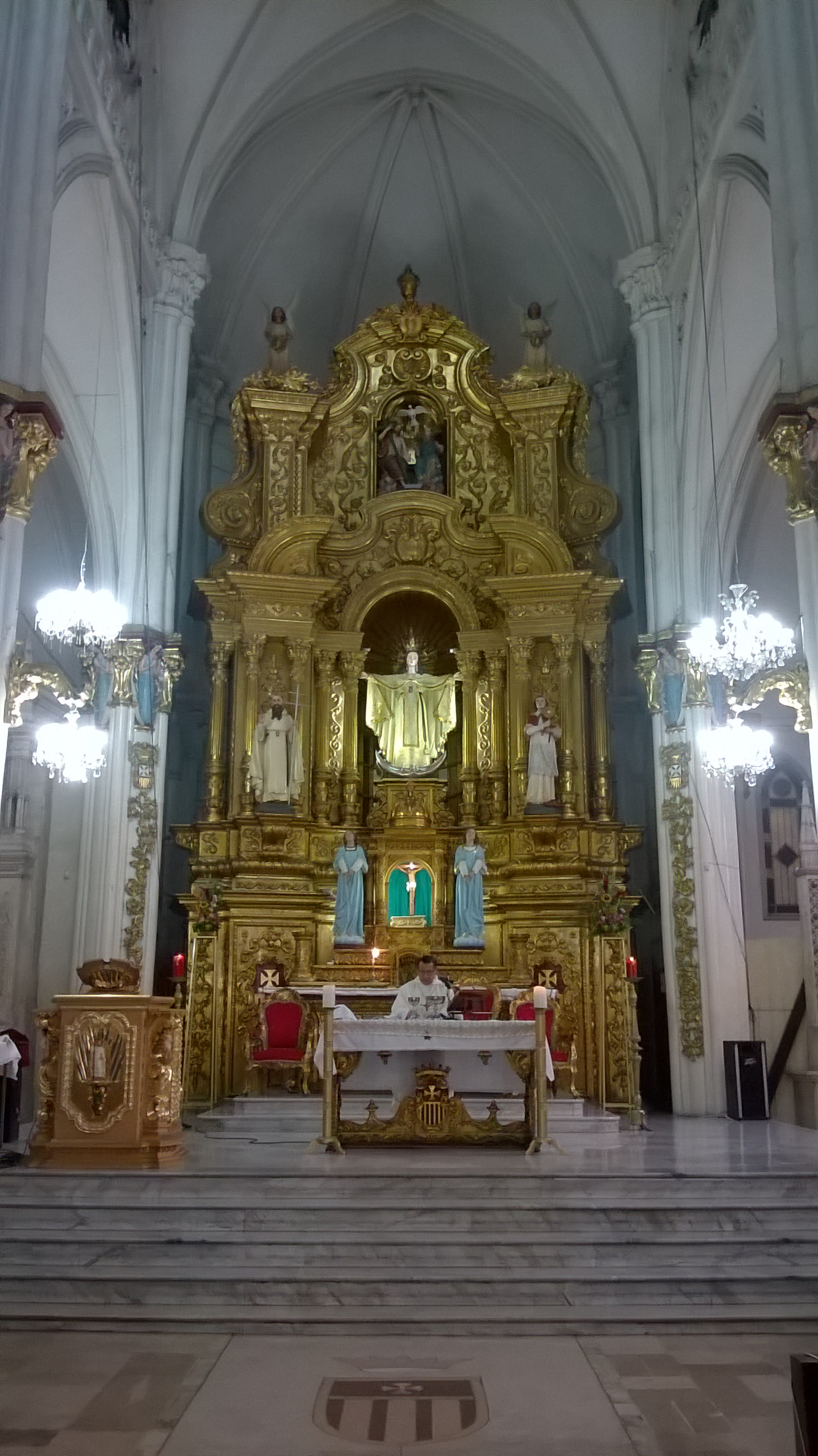
Inside Merced Basilica

- Minor Basilica: Basílica de Nuestra Señora de La Merced in Guayaquil

== Leadership ==
Bishops of Guayaquil

- Francisco Xavier de Garaycoa (1838 – 5 Sep 1851), appointed Archbishop of Quito
- Tomás Aguirre (22 Jul 1861 – 14 May 1868)
- José María Lizarzabaru y Borja, SJ (22 Nov 1869 – 17 Oct 1877)
- Roberto Maria Pozo y Martin, SJ (13 Nov 1884 – 1909)
- Juan María Riera, OP (19 Jan 1912 – 20 Nov 1915)
- Andrés Machado, SJ (26 Apr 1916 – 22 Jan 1926)
- Carlos María Javier de la Torre (20 Dec 1926 – 8 Sep 1933), appointed Archbishop of Quito (Cardinal in 1953)
- Giuseppe Felix Heredia Zurita, SJ (16 Dec 1937 – 2 Aug 1954)
- Cesar Antonio Mosquera Corral* (11 Oct 1954 – 11 Mar 1969)
  - Became archbishop on 22 Jan 1956

Archbishops of Guayaquil

- Bernardino Echeverría Ruiz, OFM (10 Apr 1969 – 7 Dec 1989); elevated to Cardinal in 1994
- Juan Ignacio Larrea Holguín (7 Dec 1989 – 7 May 2003)
- Antonio Arregui Yarza (7 May 2003 – 24 Sep 2015)
- Luis Cabrera Herrera, OFM (24 Sep 2015 – present)

Coadjutor archbishop

- Juan Ignacio Larrea Holguín (1988-1989)

Auxiliary bishops

- Luis Tola y Avilés (1863-1871), appointed Bishop of Portoviejo (Porto Vecchio)
- Silvio Luis Haro Alvear (1950-1955), appointed Bishop of Ibarra
- José Gabriel Diaz Cueva (1964-1967), appointed Auxiliary Bishop of Cuenca
- Vicente Rodrigo Cisneros Durán (1967-1969), appointed Bishop of Ambato
- Ernesto Alvarez Alvarez, SDB (1967-1970 and, as Archbishop (personal title), 1980-1984), appointed Coadjutor Archbishop of Cuenca in 1970
- Raúl Eduardo Vela Chiriboga (1972-1975), appointed Bishop of Azogues; future Cardinal
- Hugolino Felix Cerasuolo Stacey, OFM (1975-1985), appointed Bishop of Loja
- Luis Enrique Orellana Ricaurte, SJ (1978-1986), appointed Auxiliary Bishop of Quito
- Olindo Natale Spagnolo Martellozzo, MCCJ (1990-2001)
- Victor Manuel Maldonado Barreno, OFM (1990-2003)
- Aníbal Nieto Guerra, OCD (2006-2009), appointed Bishop of San Jacinto de Yaguachi
- Marcos Aurelio Pérez Caicedo (2006-2012), appointed Bishop of Babahoyo
- Valter Dario Maggi (2008-2011), appointed Bishop of Ibarra
- Guido Iván Minda Chalá (2009-2022)
- Giovanni Battista Piccioli (2013-2022)
- Bertram Víctor Wick Enzler (2013-2015), appointed Bishop of Santo Domingo and Ecuador
- Antonio Crameri, SSC (2019-2021)
- Gerardo Miguel Nieves Loja (since 2021)
- Gustavo Adolfo Rosales Escobar (2022–2025)

Another priest of this diocese who became bishop

- Eduardo José Castillo Pino, appointed Auxiliary Bishop of Portoviejo in 2012

== Suffragan dioceses ==
- Diocese of Babahoyo
- Diocese of Daule
- Diocese of San Jacinto
- Diocese of Santa Elena

== See also ==
- Roman Catholicism in Ecuador
