= Statistical Office of Montenegro =

Statistics agency of Montenegro

MONSTAT
- Montenegrin: Uprava za statistiku Crne Gore
- Location of MONSTAT headquarters in Podgorica

Agency overview
- Headquarters: IV Proleterske 2, 81000 Podgorica, Montenegro; 42.44044°N 19.26688°E
- Agency executive: Gordana Radojevic
- Website: www.monstat.org

Statistical Office of Montenegro (Montenegrin: Uprava za statistiku Crne Gore) or MONSTAT is the statistics agency of Montenegro. It provides information service and indicators for monitoring the economic and social development of Montenegro, and regularly publishes publications compiling figures about the country.
