= Guayaquil Metropolitan Cathedral =

Coordinates: 2.194546°S 79.884124°W

- Cathedral exterior

- Location in Ecuador
- Location: Guayaquil
- Country: Ecuador
- Denomination: Roman Catholic

Architecture
- Heritage designation: National Monument
- Architect: Juan Antonio Orús Madinyá
- Style: Neogothic
- Groundbreaking: 1924
- Completed: 1937

Administration
- Archdiocese: Archdiocese of Guayaquil

The Metropolitan Cathedral of Guayaquil (officially the Cathedral of Saint Peter) is a cathedral in the center of Guayaquil, Ecuador.

The current cathedral is the successor of the cathedral that was Guayaquil's main cathedral at the time of the city's founding. The original cathedral was made of wood and located on Santa Ana Hill. This cathedral was destroyed in a fire in 1892.

The current building was constructed in a neo-Gothic style between 1924 and 1937. It is located on Calle Chimborazo between Avenida 10 de Agosto and Avenida Clemente Ballén.
