= Timeline of Opus Dei =

Opus Dei: A Historical Timeline shows the historical development of Opus Dei.

== History of Opus Dei ==
- 1902: 9 January. Birth of the founder, St. Josemaría Escrivá, in Barbastro Spain
- 1917: According to Escriva, he received "inklings" of a "special call", after seeing "footprints in the snow," sign of the generosity of a monk who walked barefooted in winter
- 1925: 28 March. St. Josemaría Escrivá is ordained as a priest.
- 1928: 2 October. Founding of Opus Dei. Having "no plans nor project" of his own, Escriva "saw Opus Dei." "On this day," he wrote, "our Lord started His Work. He founded Opus Dei".
- 1930: 14 February. Founding of the Women's branch of Opus Dei.
- 1933: The first center of Opus Dei was opened in Madrid: Derecho y Arquitectura, an academy teaching law and architecture. This would later become a residence for students, the base for giving catechesis to children and for taking care of the poor and sick in the area.
- 1936: Start of Spanish Civil War which unleashed an aggressive persecution of priests, monks and Catholic laity by the anti-clerical Republicans and their stalinist allies.
- 1939: The Way, Escriva's best-selling spiritual considerations, was first published. Opus Dei started to expand to other cities outside of Madrid.
- 1941: Opus Dei is granted first diocesan approval by the Bishop of Madrid.
- 1943: 14 February. Founding of the Priestly Society of the Holy Cross, an organization for the sanctification of secular priests through their pastoral work. According to Escriva, God showed him during Mass the juridical solution to enable priests to be ordained for Opus Dei.
- 1946: Beginning of Opus Dei in Portugal, Italy, and England. Escriva moves to Rome to establish the headquarters of Opus Dei there.
- 1949: Opus Dei begins spreading overseas, starting in Mexico and the United States.
  The Way, 999 spiritual considerations written by Escriva.
- 1950: 16 June. In 1950 with the first constitutions Pope Pius XII grants Opus Dei definitive approval.
- 1962: Start of the Second Vatican Council, which proclaimed the universal call to holiness and initiates the legal framework called the personal prelature.
- In 1974, amidst the installation of the military dictatorship of Pinochet, Josemaría Escrivá visits Chile marking the beginning of Opus Dei in the country. This has been identified as one strand of a wider phenomenon of influence from Francoist Spain in Chile.
- 1975: 26 June. Death of St. Josemaría Escrivá. Father Álvaro del Portillo y Diez de Solano elected as his successor.
- 1975: 7 July. Consecration of the Shrine of Our Lady of Torreciudad in Aragon, Northern Spain.
- 1982: 28 November. Establishment of Opus Dei as a personal prelature. Pope John Paul II appoints Monsignor Álvaro del Portillo as Prelate of Opus Dei.
- 1985: Inauguration of Roman Academic Center of the Holy Cross which in 1998 would become the Pontifical University of the Holy Cross.
- 1991: 6 January. Pope John Paul II ordained Monsignor Álvaro del Portillo to the Episcopate as Titular Bishop of Vita and Prelate of Opus Dei.
- 1992: 17 May. Beatification of Escriva. One third of the world's bishops asked for the beatification.
- 1994: del Portillo dies. Monsignor Javier Echevarria was appointed prelate.
- 1995: 6 January. Pope John Paul II, with Cardinal Giovanni Battista Re and Monsignor Jorge Mejía, Titular Archbishop of Apollonia, consecrated Monsignor Javier Echevarria a bishop.
- 2002: 6 October. Canonization of St. Josemaría Escrivá.
- 2014: 27 September. Beatification of Bl. Álvaro del Portillo y Díez de Sollano.
- 2019: 18 May. Beatification of Bl. Guadalupe Ortiz de Landázuri Fernández de Heredia.

== Sources ==
- Peter Berglar (1994). Opus Dei. Life and Work of its Founder. Scepter. ISBN 0-933932-65-0.—A study of Opus Dei based on the life story and work of its founder written by a professor of history at the University of Cologne
- Salvador Bernal, Msgr. Josemaría Escrivá de Balaguer: a profile of the Founder of Opus Dei, Veritas 1978.
- Dennis Helming, Footprints in the snow. A pictorial biography of the founder of Opus Dei. Scepter 1986. - the first biography written by an American.
- Andres Vasquez de Prada: The Founder of Opus Dei. The Life of Josemaria Escrivá, Scepter Publishers 1997.
- Pilar Urbano, El hombre de Villa Tevere: los años romanos de Josemaría Escrivá de Balaguer, Plaza & Janés, 1995. ISBN 84-9793-378-8
- Personal Prelature of Opus Dei at Catholic Hierarchy Website
