= Diocese of Ibarra =

Roman Catholic diocese in Ecuador

Coordinates: 0.3520°N 78.1174°W

Diocese of Ibarra Dioecesis Ibarrensis

Catholic

Location
- Country: Ecuador
- Ecclesiastical province: Province of Quito

Statistics
- Area: 4,986 km^{2} (1,925 sq mi)
- Population: Total; Catholics: (as of 2006); 340,000; 324,700 (95.5%)
- Parishes: 61

Information
- Denomination: Roman Catholic
- Rite: Latin Rite
- Established: December 29, 1862 (163 years ago)

Current leadership
- Pope: Leo XIV
- Bishop: Segundo René Coba Galarza
- Bishops emeritus: Valter Dario Maggi

Map
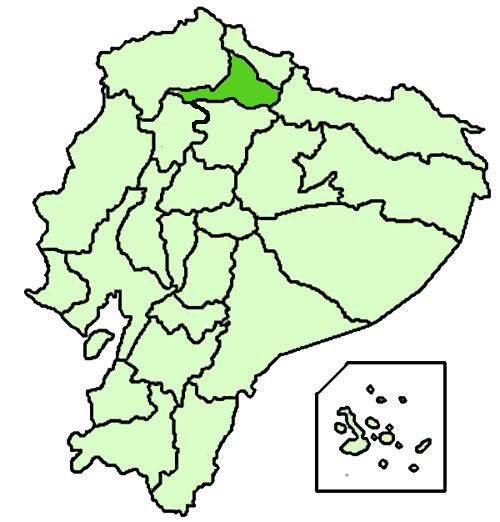

The Roman Catholic Diocese of Ibarra (Latin: Dioecesis Ibarrensis) is a diocese located in the city of Ibarra in the ecclesiastical province of Quito in Ecuador.

== Churches ==
- Basílica de Nuestra Señora de La Merced

== Bishops ==
=== Ordinaries ===
- José Ignacio Checa y Barbo (6 August 1866 – 16 March 1868), appointed Archbishop of Quito
- Antonio Tommaso Yturalde (25 June 1869 –1 July 1876)
- Pedro Rafael González (Gonsález) (29 September 1876 – 15 June 1893), appointed Coadjutor Archbishop of Quito
- Federico Gonsález y Suárez (30 July 1895 – 14 December 1905), appointed Archbishop of Quito
- Ulpiano Maria Perez y Quinones (8 May 1907 – 7 December 1916), appointed Bishop of Bolivar
- Alberto Maria Ordóñez Crespo (4 December 1916 – 5 December 1930), appointed Bishop of Bolivar
- Alessandro Pasquel (18 December 1931 – 18 September 1934)
- Cesar Antonio Mosquera Corral (18 September 1936 – 11 October 1954), appointed Bishop of Guayaquil
- Silvio Luis Haro Alvear (23 March 1955 – 28 June 1980)
- Juan Ignacio Larrea Holguín (28 June 1980 – 5 August 1983), appointed Bishop of Ecuador, Military
- Luis Oswaldo Pérez Calderón (21 August 1984 – 22 September 1989)
- Antonio Arregui Yarza (25 July 1995 – 7 May 2003), appointed Archbishop of Guayaquil
- Julio César Terán Dutari, S.J. (14 February 2004 – 25 March 2011)
- Valter Dario Maggi (25 March 2011 – 13 October 2018)
- Segundo René Coba Galarza (12 December 2019 – present)

=== Other priests of this diocese who became bishops ===
- Nicanor Carlos Gavinales Chamorro, appointed Bishop of Portoviejo (Porto Vecchio) in 1947
- Guido Iván Minda Chalá, appointed Auxiliary Bishop of Guayaquil in 2009
- Geovanni Mauricio Paz Hurtado, appointed Bishop of Latacunga in 2016
