= Duthoit =

Duthoit is the name of several people:

- Aimé Duthoit (1803–1869), French draughtsman, designer and sculptor, known with Louis as frères Duthoit
- Éliane Duthoit (born 1946), French diplomat
- Jack Duthoit (1918–2001), English professional footballer
- Louis Duthoit (1807–1874), French draughtsman, designer and sculptor, known with Aimé as frères Duthoit
