= Paul Dahdah =

Paul Dahdah OCD
- Vicar Apostolic Emeritus of Beirut
- Native name: بول دحداح
- Church: Catholic Church
- See: Apostolic Vicariate of Beirut
- In office: 30 July 1999 – 20 August 2016
- Predecessor: Paul Bassim
- Successor: César Essayan
- Other post: Titular Archbishop of Arae in Numidia (since 1999)
- Previous post: Archbishop of Baghdad (1983-1999)

Orders
- Ordination: 17 April 1966
- Consecration: 21 August 1983 by Luciano Angeloni

Personal details
- Born: 8 January 1941 (age 85) Zgharta, North Governorate, Lebanon

Paul Dahdah, OCD (born 8 January 1941) is a former bishop of the Apostolic Vicariate of Beirut.

He was born in Zgharta, Lebanon. He joined the Discalced Carmelites and was ordained to priesthood on 17 April 1966.

Pope John Paul II appointed him Archbishop of Baghdad on 30 May 1983. He received his episcopal consecration of the Apostolic Nuncio in Lebanon, Luciano Angeloni, on 21 August of the same year. His co-consecrators were Raphael I Bidawid, Chaldean Catholic Patriarch of Babylon and Paul Bassim, OCD, Vicar Apostolic Emeritus of Beirut.

On 30 July 1999 Dahdah was appointed Vicar Apostolic of Beirut and Titular Bishop of Arae in Numidia. On 2 August 2016, Pope Francis accepted his age-related resignation.
