= Delobel =

Delobel is a surname. Notable people with the surname include:

- Jean Delobel (1933–2013), French politician
- Isabelle Delobel (born 1978), French ice dancer
- Nicolas Delobel (1693–1763), French painter
- Véronique Delobel (born 1978), French ice dancer, twin sister of Isabelle
