= Apostolic Vicariate of Beirut =

Catholic missionary jurisdiction in Lebanon

Apostolic Vicariate of Beirut Vicariatus Apostolicus Berytensis

Location
- Country: Lebanon

Statistics
- Parishes: 10 parishes
- Members: 18,000

Information
- Denomination: Catholic Church
- Sui iuris church: Latin Church
- Rite: Roman Rite
- Established: 4 June 1953
- Cathedral: St Louis
- Secular priests: 4

Current leadership
- Apostolic Vicar: Cesar Essayan, OFMConv

The Apostolic Vicariate of Beirut (Latin: Vicariatus Apostolicus Berytensis) is a Latin Church ecclesiastical jurisdiction or apostolic vicariate of the Catholic Church in Lebanon, where Eastern Catholics are far more numerous. In 2022, there were about 18,000 Catholics in ten parishes in the Apostolic Vicariate of Beirut. Its current bishop is Cesar Essayan who was appointed in 2016. Its cathedral episcopal see is the St. Louis Cathedral, Beirut in the national capital city Beirut, while the former Crusader Cathedral of Tyre is in ruins.

== Antecedents ==
The Catholic presence in Lebanon of the Latin Church began with the Crusades in the late of eleventh century and ends with the final defeat of the Crusaders and the disappearance of the Crusader principalities in the Levant after the middle of the thirteenth century. In this period, in the lands corresponding to the current Lebanon were established several Latin ecclesiasticals, which most of the time they were supplanting ancient bishoprics of the early days of Christianity: the Archdiocese of Tyre from which depended the suffragan dioceses of Latin Catholic Bishop of Acre, Caesarea Philippi, Sidon and Berytus (modern Beirut), while from the Latin Patriarch of Antioch depended the suffragan dioceses of Byblos, Tripoli and Antarado. These dioceses disappeared with the end of the Crusader period and remain today mostly as the venue owners.

The Latin continued presence in the country with the Friars Minor, who arrived as early as the thirteenth century, and then with missionaries of other religious orders, such as the Capuchin Friars, the Carmelites, the Vincentians and the Jesuits, who arrived in the seventeenth century. The Maronite Joseph Assemani acted as papal legate for the Lebanese Council of 1736 and presented there the reform proposals for the Maronite Church. For the faithful of the Latin Rite of Lebanon was not instituted any ecclesiastical district until the end of the French mandate at the end of World War II: the Apostolic Delegate (papal diplomatic envoy) of Syria held the functions of the bishop of the Latin Catholics of Lebanon.

Medieval bishops:

- Raymond 1176–1180
- Odo c. 1182–1191
- Robert c. 1210
- Galeran c. 1233–1245
- Bernard c. 1267
- Bartholomew c. 1272–1283
- Robert ?
- Matthew 1323–1333
- Peter 1348
- James ?
- Blaise 1397

== History ==
The apostolic vicariate was erected on 4 June 1953 with the Papal bull Solent caeli of Pope Pius XII, with territory that was taken from the Syrian Apostolic Vicariate of Aleppo. The apostolic vicar is a member of the Conference of the Latin Bishops of the Arab Regions.

It enjoyed a papal visit from John Paul II in May 1997, Benedict XVI in September 2012 and Leo XIV in November 2025.

== Organisation ==
The apostolic vicariate extends its jurisdiction over all Catholic faithful of the Latin Rite in Lebanon. It is exempt, i.e. directly subject to the Holy See, not part if any ecclesiastical province.

Its territory is divided into only eighth Latin parishes.

== Episcopal ordinaries ==
(all Roman Rite)

- Eustace John Smith, OFM, Titular Bishop of Apamea Cibotus (8 December 1955 – 1973 Resignation)
- Paul Bassim, OCD, Titular Bishop of Laodicea ad Libanum (8 September 1974 – 30 July 1999 Retired)
- Paul Dahdah, OCD, Titular Archbishop of Aræ in Numidia (30 July 1999 – 2 August 2016)
- Cesar Essayan, OFMConv (2 August 2016–present)

== See also ==
- Latin Patriarchate of Jerusalem
- Latin Church in the Middle East
- List of Catholic dioceses in Lebanon

=== Eastern Catholic ===
- Armenian Catholic Archeparchy of Beirut (Metropolitanate)
- Melkite Greek Catholic Archeparchy of Beirut and Byblos (Metropolitanate)
- Maronite Catholic Archeparchy of Beirut (non-metropolitan)
- Chaldean Catholic Eparchy of Beirut
- Syrian Catholic Eparchy of Beirut (Patriarch of Antioch's proper diocese)

== Sources and external links ==
- GCatholic, with incumbent biography links
