= Saint Louis Cathedral of the Capuchin Fathers =

19th-century church in Beirut, Lebanon

St. Louis Cathedral
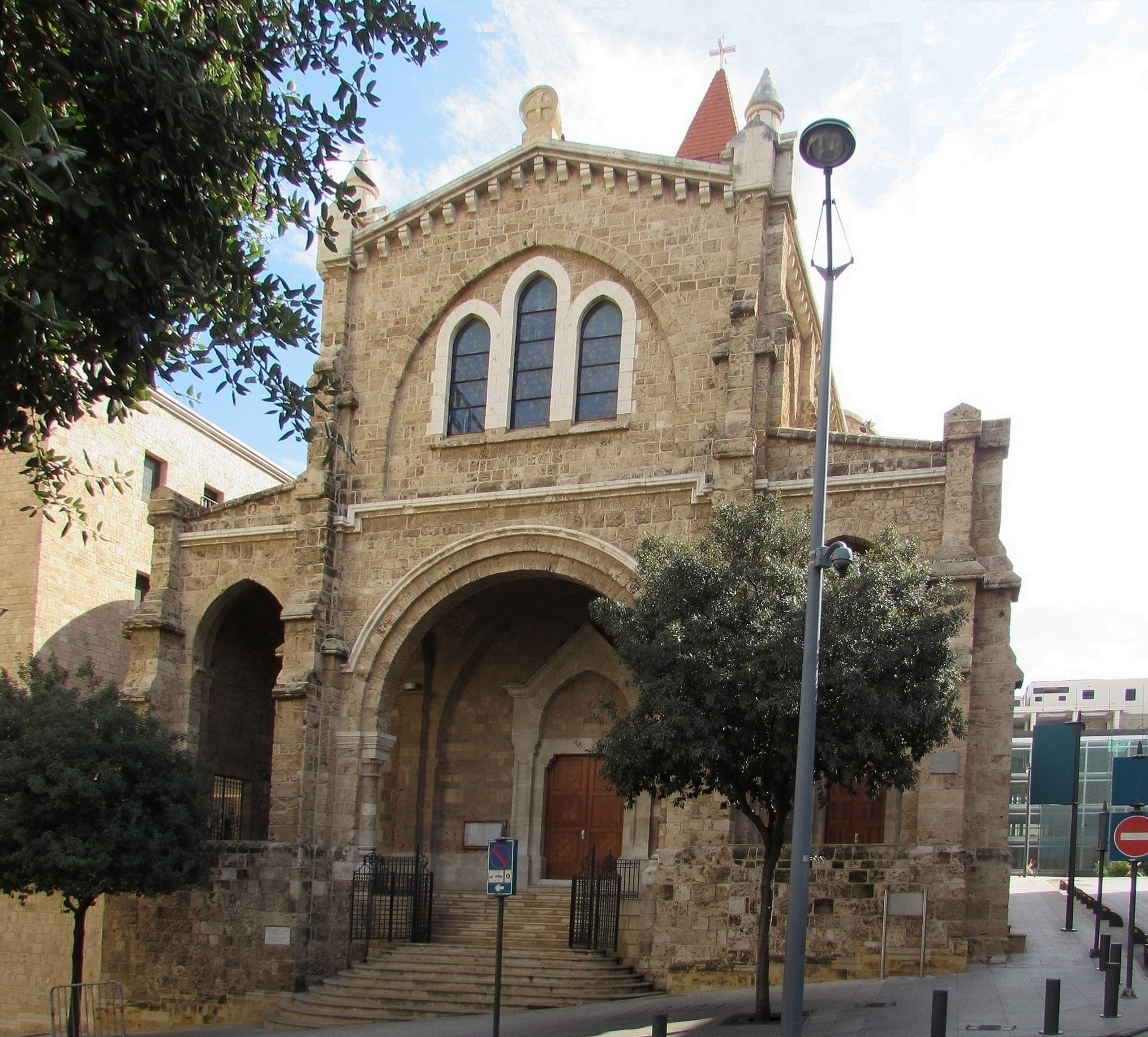

- The Cathedral shown within Beirut

Religion
- Affiliation: Order of Friars Minor Capuchin
- Patron: Saint Louis
- Year consecrated: 1868
- Status: Active

Location
- Location: Beirut, Lebanon
- Administration: Apostolic Vicariate of Beirut
- Coordinates: 33.897911°N 35.502690°E

Architecture
- Architect: Edmond Duthoit
- Style: Romanesque-Byzantine architecture
- Groundbreaking: 1864
- Completed: 1868

Specifications
- Direction of façade: Northwest
- Materials: Sandstone, marble, limestone

The Saint Louis Cathedral of the Capuchin Fathers (French: Cathédrale Saint Louis des Pères Capucins) is a small Latin Catholic cathedral and convent in Beirut, Lebanon. It stands on the northern slope of the Serail Hill, adjacent to Bab Idris, one of Beirut’s seven historic city gates. The church was built by Capuchin missionaries in 1864, and named after King Louis IX of France who is venerated as a saint by the Catholic Church. The church is well known for its towering campanile.

== History ==
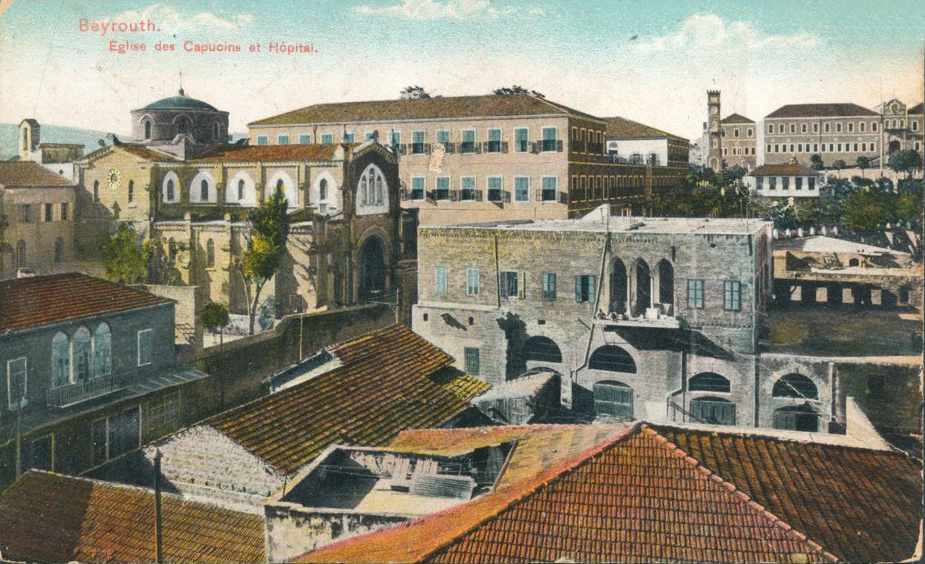
Saint Louis cathedral in 1910

=== Historical Background ===
Capuchin missionaries, sent by Father Joseph du Tremblay, reached Saida in 1626 and Beirut in 1628, thus establishing the first houses of the Custody of the Near East. Saida was then the maritime stronghold of the Maan emirs, and it remained the base of the French Capuchin Order in the Levant until 1761. The Order exercised their apostolate with Fakhr al-Din II whom, as the Order narrative goes, they had secretly baptized in 1631 under the name of Louis François Farcadin. Four years later, the Emir rebelled against his Ottoman overlords, and was trialed in Istanbul. He was charged with, and executed for insurrection and apostasy, adding some credibility to the Order’s story. The Capuchins maintained their presence in the Levant despite the loss of the sympathizing Emir.

=== The old church ===
The order did not have a place of worship in Beirut, and used old Saint George of the Maronites church until they built their own. Construction of the Order's church, dedicated to Saint Louis, begun in 1730 and lasted for two years. The building stood near the current Riad al-Solh square in the center of Beirut. It was endowed 1792 with a painting of Saint Louis by the King of France.

=== The new cathedral ===
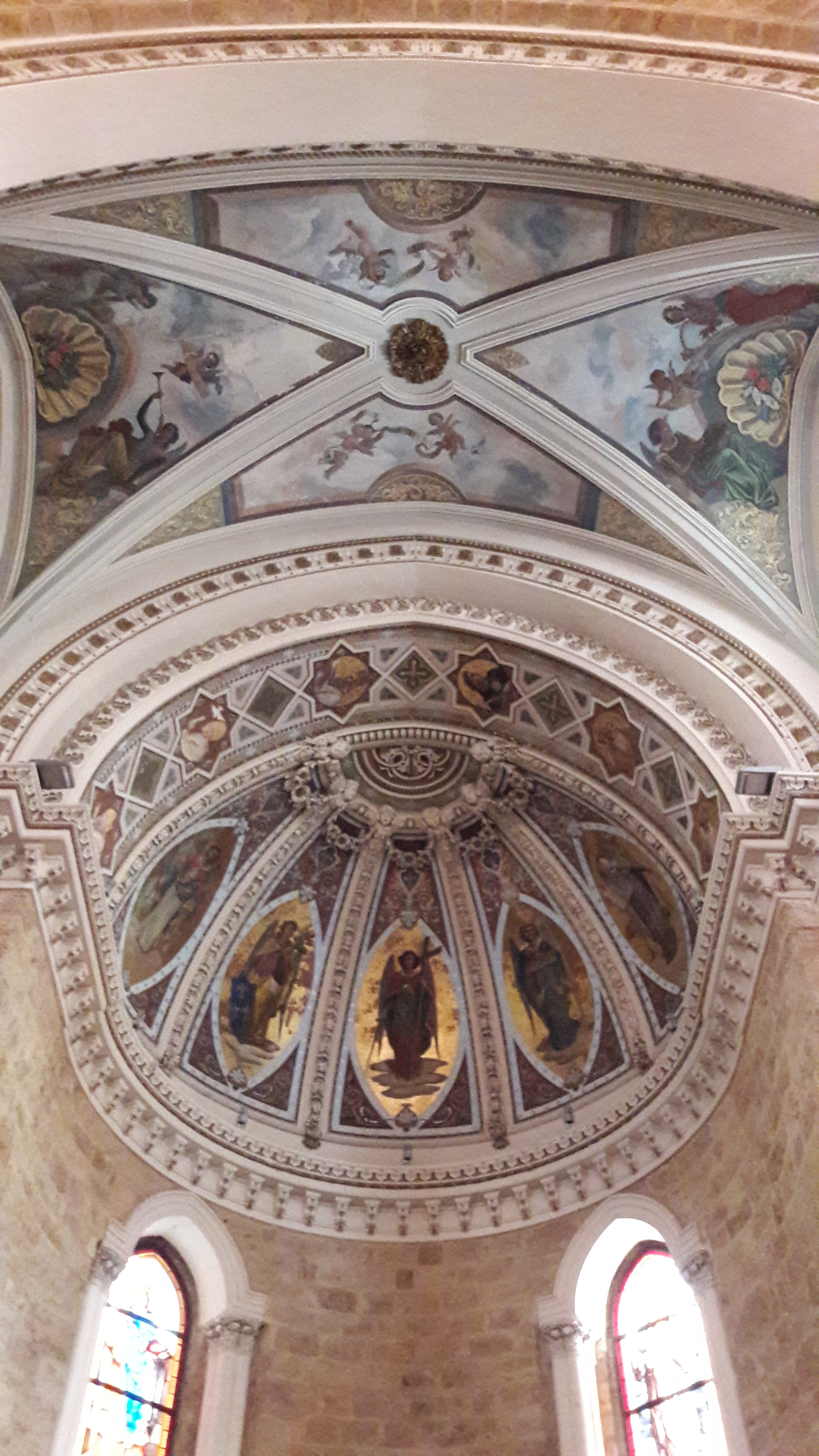
Apse ceiling

The Order commissioned the young French architect Edmond Duthoit to build the new cathedral. A plot was reserved for the cathedral and its adjoining convent on the northern slope of the Serail Hill, next to Bab Idris, one of Beirut’s seven historic city gates.

Duthoit had arrived to Beirut on 2 January 1862; he was at the time in the retinue of French diplomat and archaeologist Melchior de Vogüé in his archaeological mission headed to the Levant and Cyprus. Duthoit’s design incorporated local building materials and techniques, resulting in the church’s unique and eclectic architecture. Construction began in 1864, after the departure of the architect to Cyprus, and was completed in 1868.

The new cathedral, like the preceding church, was dedicated to Saint Louis, and was colloquially known as Saint Louis des Français (Saint Louis of the French). The new cathedral was used for official celebrations at the time of the French Mandate of Lebanon. The congregation was the only Latin parish in Beirut, it was successively managed by the Italian Capuchins (1868-1903), then by the French Capuchins (1903-1952), and currently by the Capuchin Vice Province of the Middle East.

An imposing bell tower was added to the cathedral in 1950.

=== Daughter churches ===
Three daughter churches were established since, the first one in Baabdat, in the Matn district, in 1893, and the two others in Beirut: Saint-François des Pères Capucins et Franciscains (Saint Francis of the Capuchin and Franciscan Fathers) in Hamra in 1937, and Notre-Dame des Anges (Our Lady of the Angels) in Badaro in 1960.

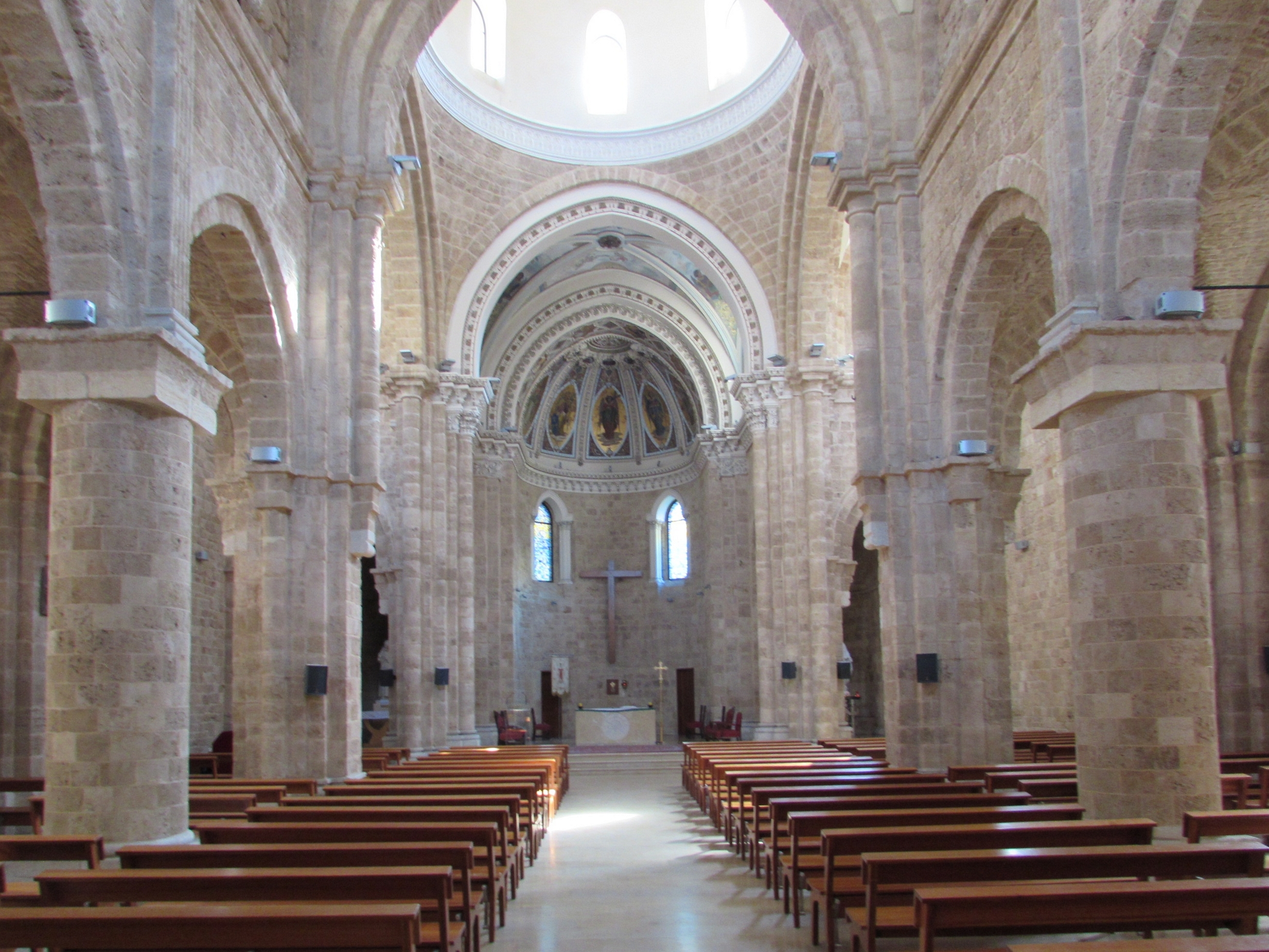
Interior of the cathedral

=== Lebanese civil war ===
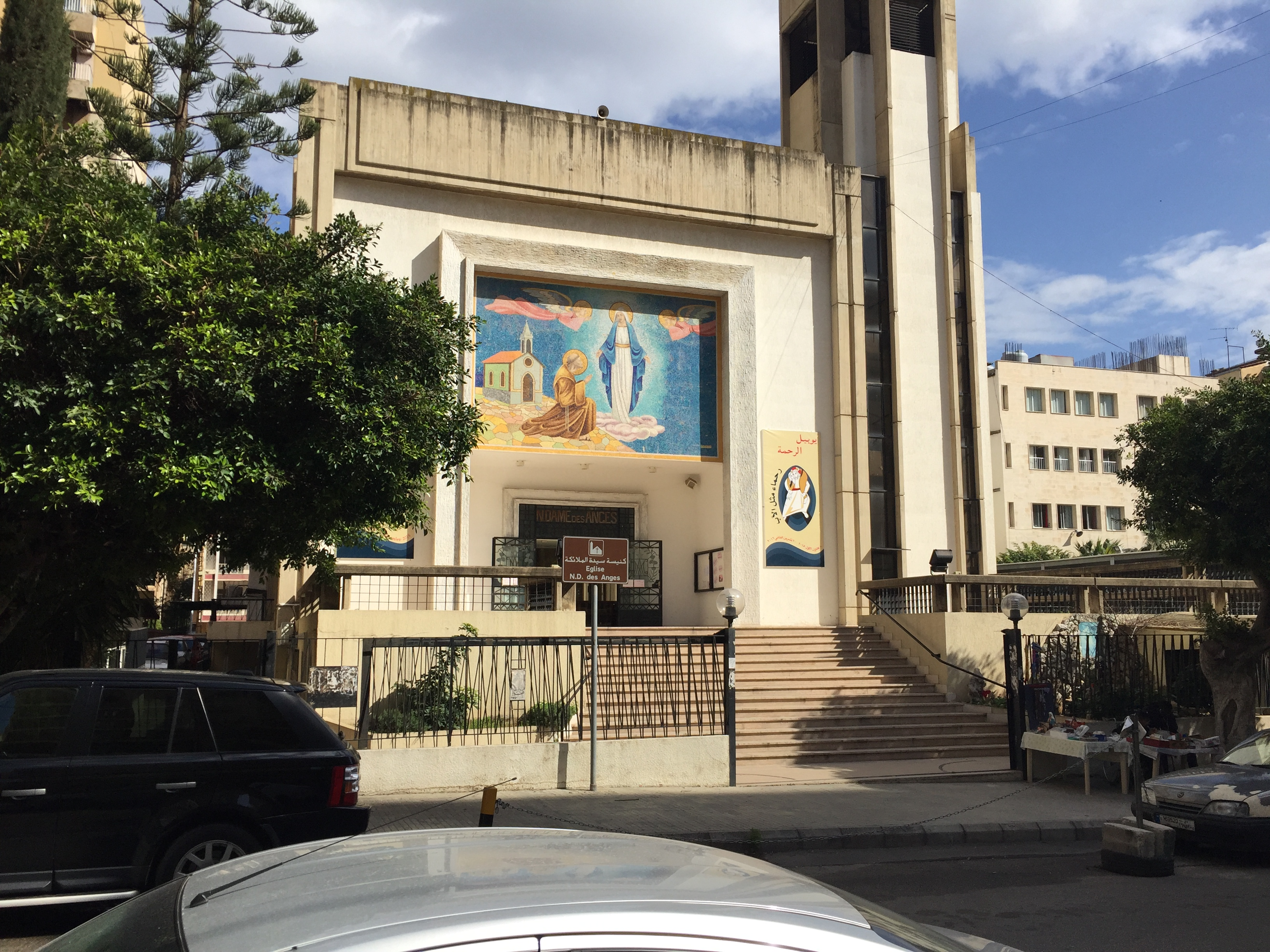
Notre Dame des Anges Church in Badaro

The cathedral was raided in December 1975 and was the scene of fierce fighting between warring factions during the Lebanese civil war. The cathedral and the convent were looted and burned, and a Lebanese friar, brother Ferdinand Abu Jaoudeh, was killed on site. After the end of the hostilities, Saint Louis was restored and reopened to the public in 2002.

== Architecture ==
The church was designed in an eclectic Romanesque-Byzantine style by French architect Edmond Duthoit.

The cathedral was lavishly decorated with extravagant gilded stucco and plaster murals, these embellishments were removed during the post-war restoration.

== See also ==
- Architecture of Lebanon
- Bab er-Derkeh
- Architect Luigi Cavelli
