= Edmond Duthoit =

French architect (1837–1889)

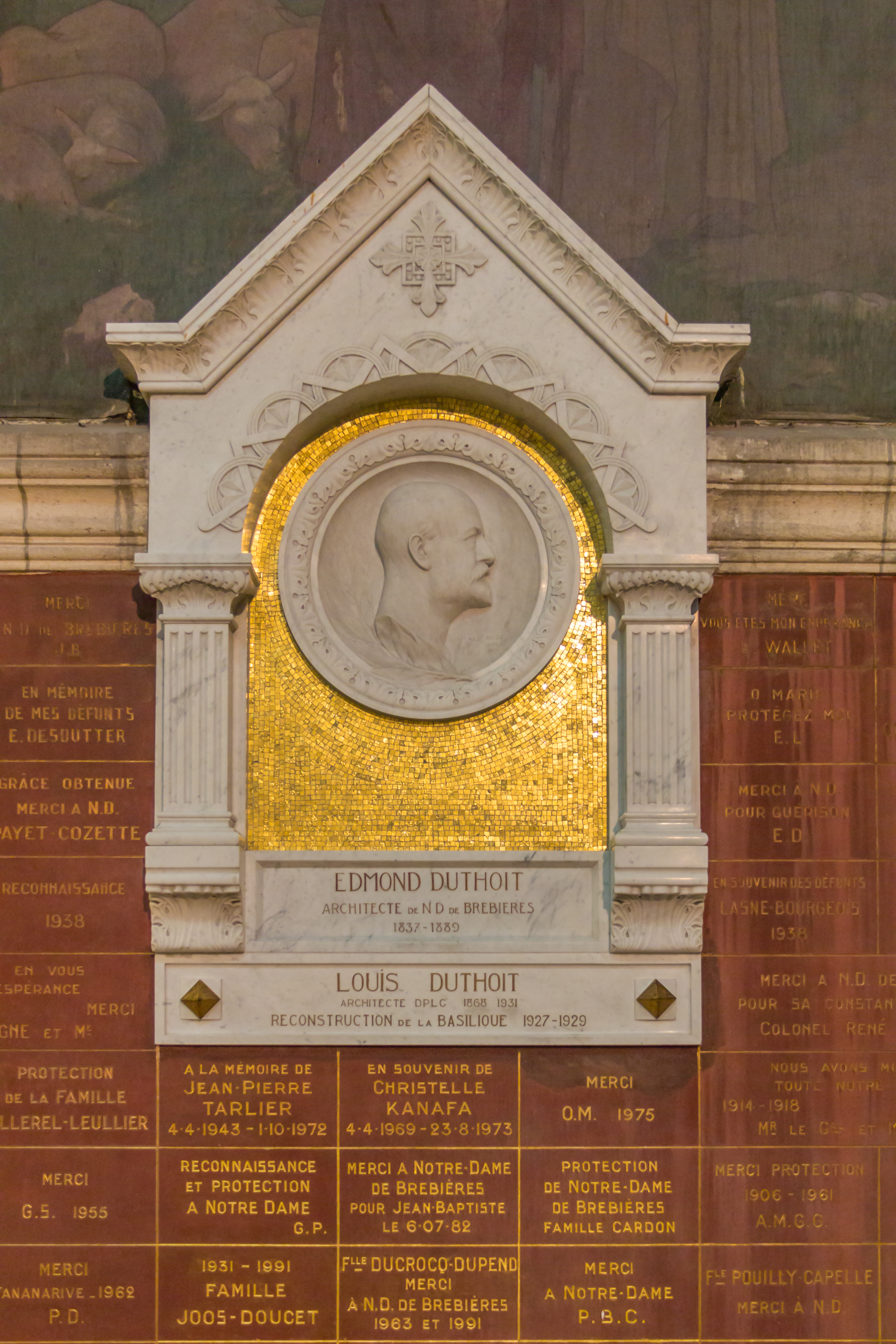
- Medallion of Edmond Duthoit, Notre-Dame of Brebières, Albert (Somme)
- Born: 1 May 1837; Amiens, Somme
- Died: 11 June 1889 (aged 52); Amiens, Somme
- Occupations: Architect, designer, archeologist
- Father: Aimé Duthoit

Edmond Clément Marie Duthoit (French pronunciation: [ɛdmɔ̃ klemɑ̃ maʁi dytwa]; 1837–1889) was a French 19th-century architect, originating from Amiens. He was the eldest son of Aimé Duthoit, the nephew of Louis Duthoit, both picard designers and sculptors, and the father of Louis Duthoit.

== Biography ==
=== Family ===
Edmond Duthoit was born on 1 May 1837 in Amiens, the eldest son of Aimé Duthoit and Joséphine Pauchot.

He married Rosalie Paillat, born 1845, and together have a son, Louis Duthoit, who will become an architect like his father.

He died on 11 June 1889, at 52 years old, in Amiens.

=== A career in the shadows of a great architect ===
Edmond Duthoit was one of the most loyal students of Eugène Viollet-le-Duc, who affectionately called him: "My young aide", along with Aimé and Louis Duthoit. He was tasked with, among others, planning certain buildings while his master was forced to constantly do "Tours de France" to visit every site.

At the castle of Roquetaillade, he accomplished one of his greatest interventions, in collaboration with Viollet-le-Duc. He followed on the spot, for his master, the decoration work and the creation of the furniture from 1864 until the fall of Napoleon III in 1870, when, for lack of money, the building site stopped. He finished the work from 1875 to 1878, notably the decorations for the 11th-century chapel. The decorations of Roquetaillade are unique because they are the only example in France of a complete work of Viollet-le-Duc: architecture, restoration, decoration, furniture and objects.

=== Edmond Duthoit and oriental art ===
During his adolescent travels to southern Spain, in North Africa and the Middle-east, Edmond Duthoit discovered Moorish art. Charged with a mission in the Orient, he accompanied, between 1861 and 1863, in Syria and Cyprus, the count Melchior de Vogüé, with whom he collaborated for the publication 'Architecture civile et religieuse du i^{er} au vii^{e} siècle en Syrie, thus the name of the room of Cypriot antiquities in the Louvre: Vogüé-Duthoit. He realized an impressive series of drawings on the monuments of the Near Orient and Algeria. He was tasked by the French government to arbiter a conflict that opposed in 1872, the municipality of Tlemcen and the population, concerning urban development near the great mosque of the city. He was from 1880 until his death architect-in-chief of the historic monuments of Algeria, and participated in the creation of archaeological searches on the Roman cities of Tipaza, Timgad and Djémila in Algeria, and others in Tunisia.

Named inspector of historic monuments of the Oise and the Somme in 1866, he moved to Amiens in 1870 and split his time between Picardy and Algeria. From 1884 onwards, he completed his masterpiece, the Notre-Dame basilisk of Brebières at Albert in the Somme, a majestic monument inspired by both Byzantine and Moorish art, where we can spot the influence of fellow architect Léon Vaudoyer.

He was a member of the antiquaries Society of Picardy.

== Major works ==
=== Restoration ===
- Restoration of Notre-Dame de Paris
- Restoration of the Amiens Cathedral (Somme)
- Restoration of Senlis Cathedral
- Chapelle du château d'Abbadie
- Basilisk of the Nativity of Béthléem
- Collegial Notre-Dame of Montataire
- Church of Saint-Étienne de Beauvais
- Abbey of Saint-Martin-aux-Bois
- Berteaucourt-les-Dames abbey
- Church of Saint-Martin de Namps-au-Val
- Château de Pierrefonds
- Château de Roquetaillade
- Château de Sully
- Château de La Rivière

=== Construction and decorations ===
- Pont-Noyelles: colonne Faidherbe (1872)
- Albert (Somme): notre-Dame basilisk of Brebières (1885–1897)
- Brias: neo-gothic church
- Pittefaux: church of Souverain Moulin
- Boulogne-sur-Mer: décoration of the cathedral

== Publication ==
- Un Amiénois en Orient, Edmond Duthoit, architecte 1837–1889, 1936

== Distinctions ==
- He was a knight of the Légion d'Honneur
- He was an officer of the Médjidié Order.
