= Château d'Abbadia =

Coordinates: 43°22′39″N 1°44′57″W

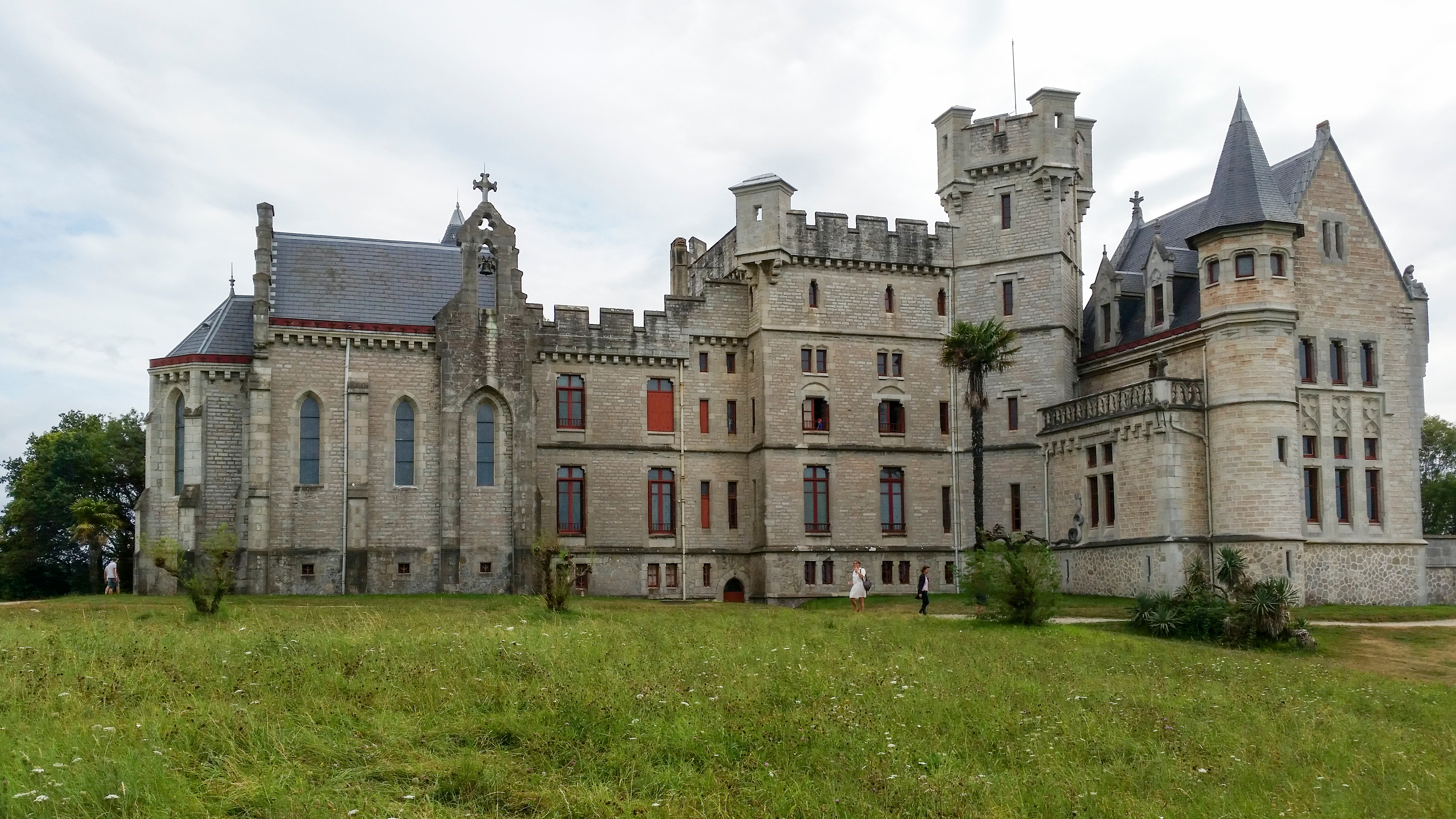
- Interactive map of the Château d'Abbadia area

General information
- Architectural style: Neogothic
- Location: France
- Construction started: 1864
- Construction stopped: 1879
- Owner: French Academy of Sciences

Design and construction
- Architect: Eugène Viollet-le-Duc

The Château d'Abbadia, also Château d'Abbadie, is a neogothic château situated in Hendaye, Pyrénées-Atlantiques, France. Built by Eugène Viollet-le-Duc and Edmond Duthoit, both patronized by the explorer Antoine d'Abbadie, between 1864 and 1879, it is classified as a historic monument and "Maison des Illustres". The scientific collections, archives and furniture are all authentic and make up a considerable cultural heritage of the 19th century.

== The elements of the castle ==
The exterior architecture of the building is in the Irish Gothic Revival style. It consists of a central building (square tower) from which three extensions start:

- A south wing, intended for receptions and ended by the round tower.
- An east wing, of empowerment, finished by the chapel.
- The observatory located at the northwestern end, accessed through a small square tower (at 45°); the meridian telescope is located at the western end, observing through openings closed by shutters.

All the towers and wings are crenellated. Three turrets complete the structure, on the round tower (facing northeast) at the southeastern end of the wing leading to the chapel and at the northeastern corner of the observatory (stairway).

The entrance porch lies southeast between the two wings; the doorway opens into the large vestibule (south of the central tower), 10 meters (33 feet) high, beneath the statue of Abdullah. Aiming toward La Rhune leads to the east side of the entrance doorway.

The central body houses (on the north side) the Chamber of Honor on the first floor and the library upstairs.

The south wing houses the library upstairs:

- On the first floor, the dining room and the large living room in the tower (with its Arabic smoking room in the turret).
- Upstairs (on the west side), the Ethiopia Room (blue), the Jerusalem Room (red), and the Tower Room.

The east wing houses :

- On the first floor (north side), the small salon called the Arab salon and then the chapel.
- On the first floor, the Virginia room, with its Persian boudoir in the turret and its dressing room open onto the chapel, allowing one to follow the religious service.
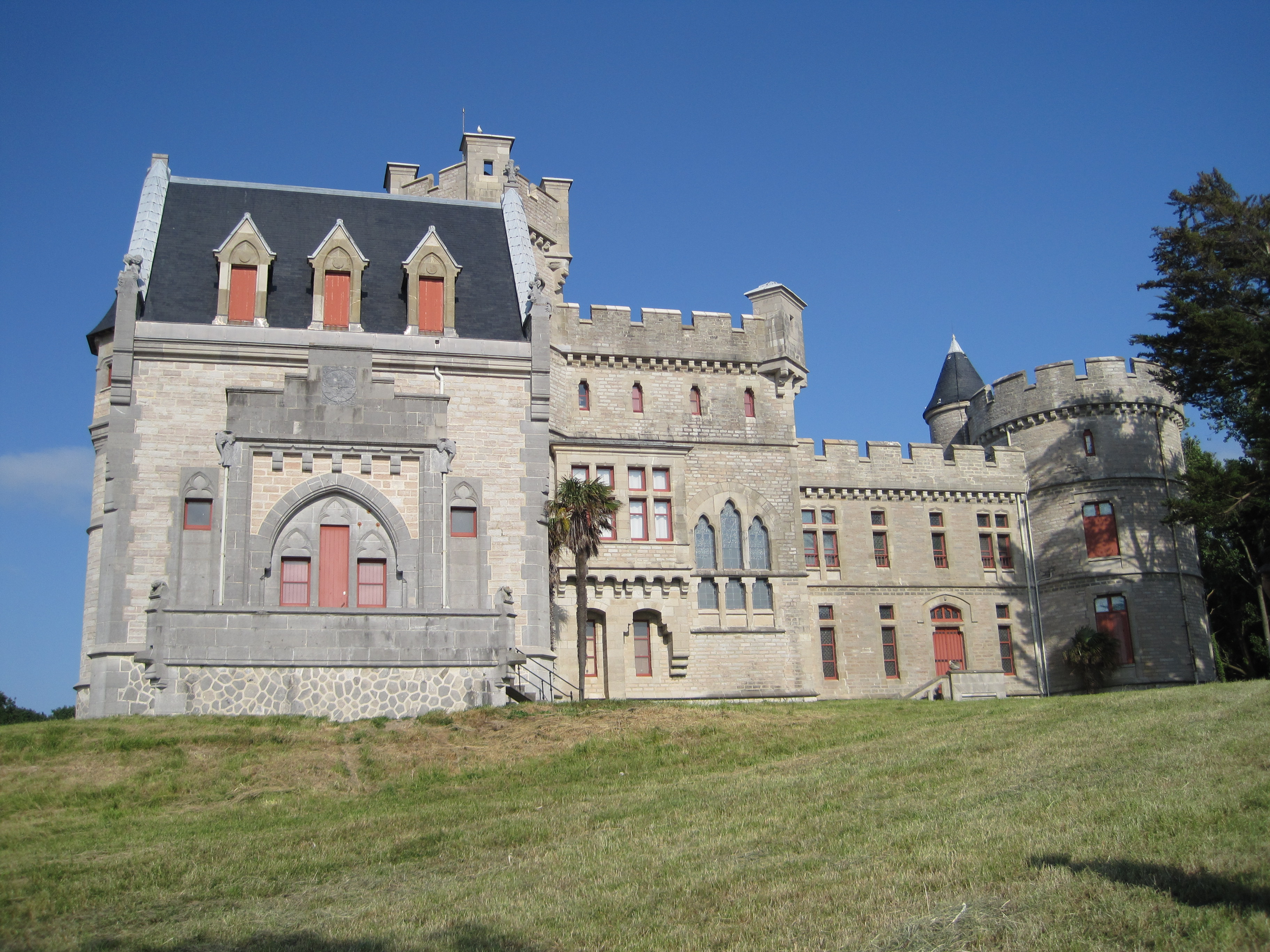
Image of the chateau

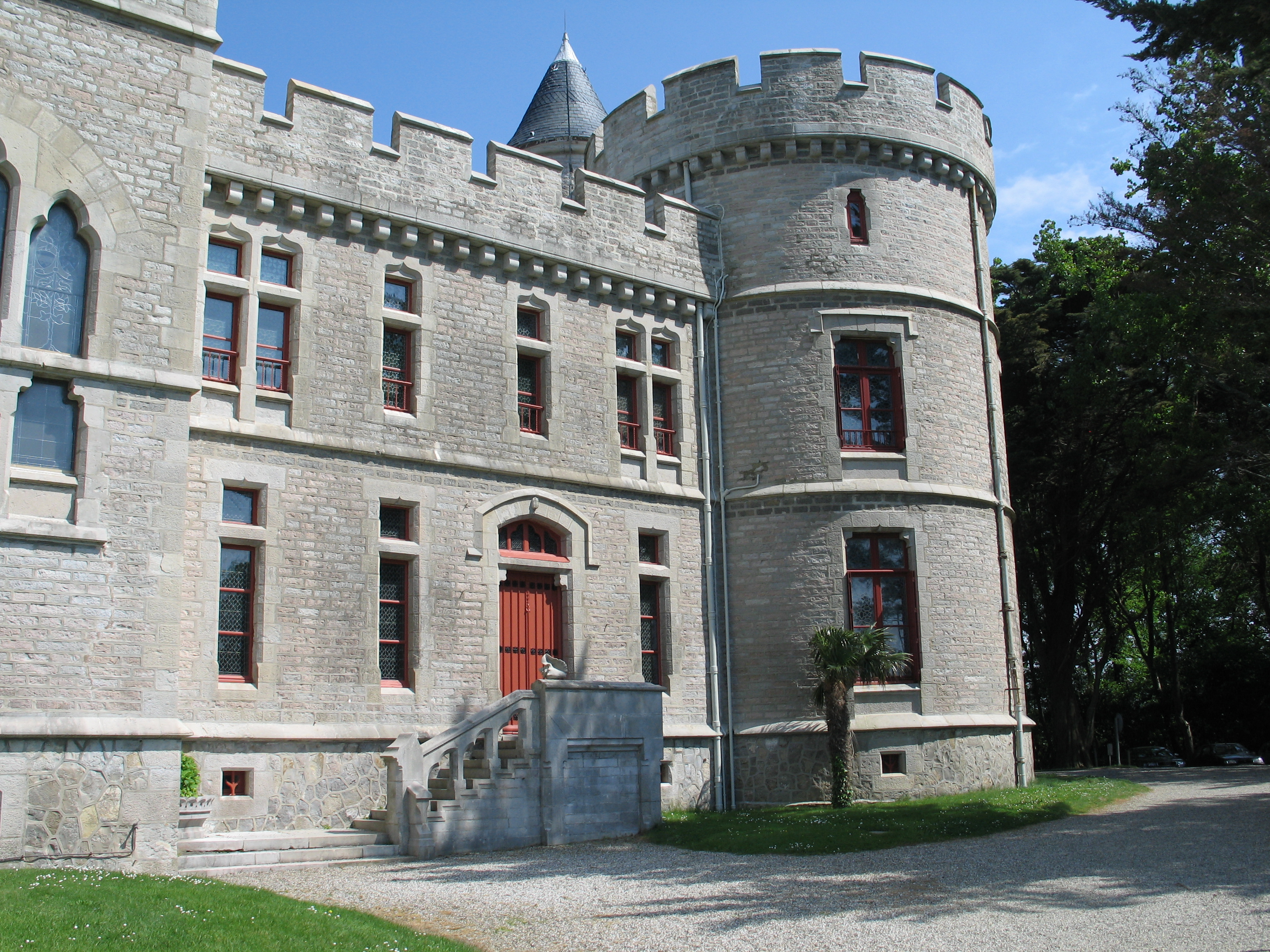
The southern wing

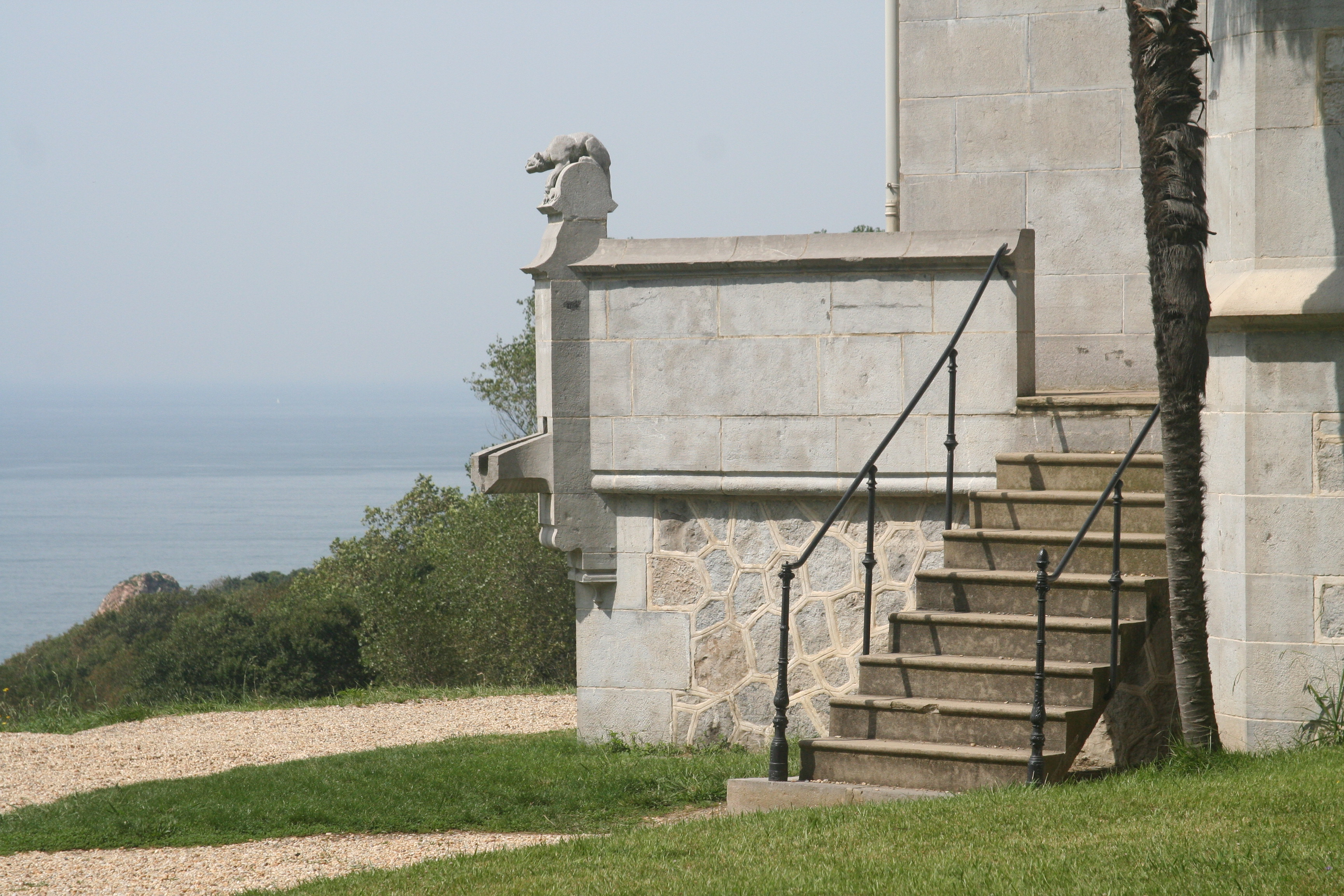
Southern wing staircase

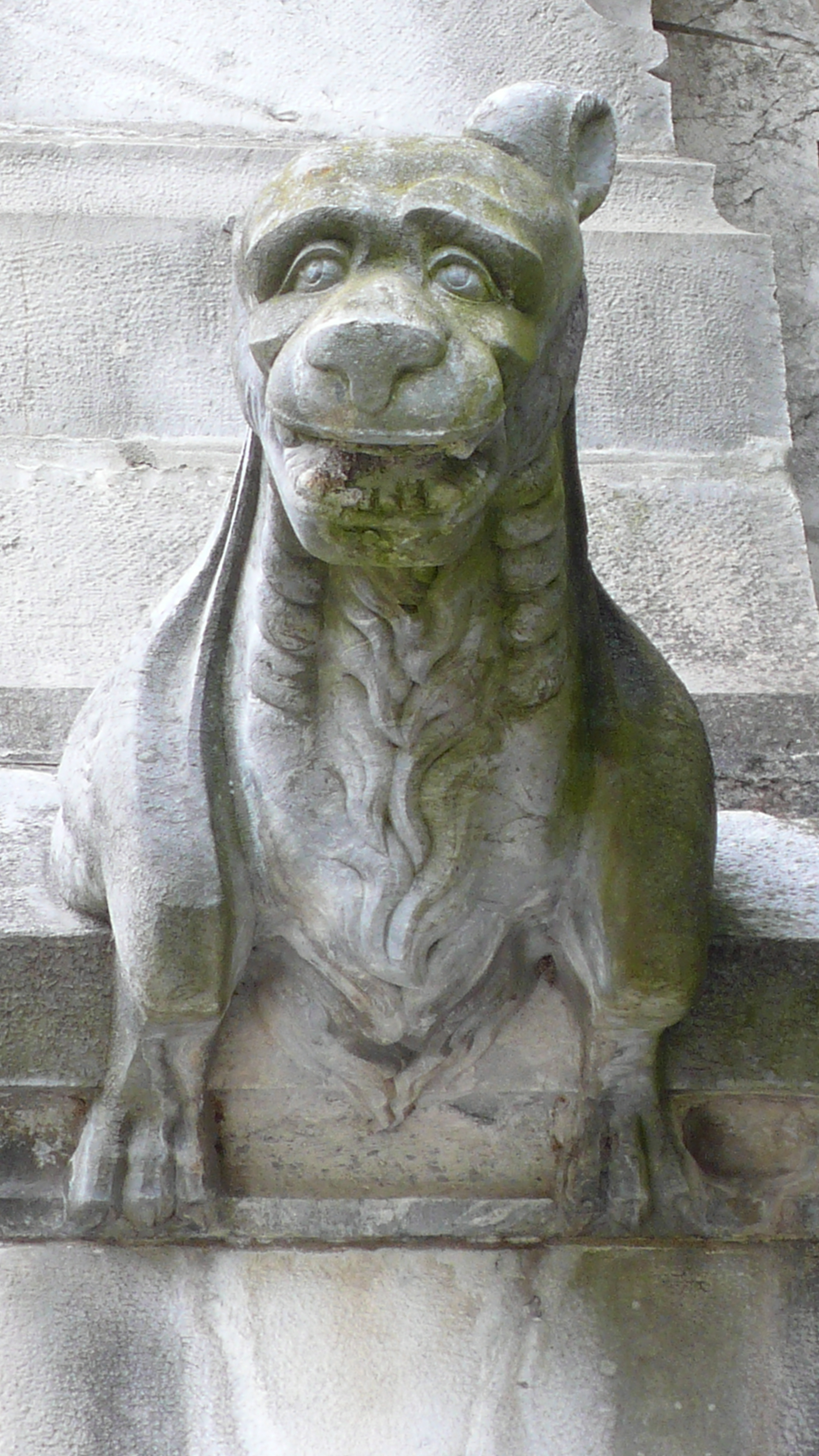
A gargoyle

=== Decorations, inscriptions and bestiary ===
The castle is distinguished by the richness of its ornamental materials (woodwork, staff, earthenware, painting on plaster, textiles), its polychrome interior decoration, the eclecticism of its inspiration, from the radiant Gothic to the orientalism, very fashionable at the end of the 19th century and tinged with romanticism.

Everywhere, formulas in Basque, Irish, Guèze, Arabic, Latin, English or German testify to the cultural curiosity and philosophical values of Antoine d'Abbadie. Basque maxims such as Bizi bedi euskara (Long live Euskara) celebrate the Basque Country. Scholars such as Jules Mohl, a member of the Academy of Inscriptions and Belles-Lettres, participate in the elaboration of ornamental inscriptions.

Four halls have allowed to express the oriental inspiration:

- The room of honor
- The Persian boudoir of the bedroom, circular, implanted in a turret
- The Moorish smoking room, of circular architecture (2.40 m in diameter and 2.20 m high) in the South Tower
- The Arabic living room on the first floor.

All contribute to the stylistic mix of the building.

Other ornaments recall the explorations of the Abbadian brothers in Ethiopia. The emblematic or symbolic animals bear witness to the 19th century's taste for orientalism. Crocodiles, snakes, elephants, monkeys, shells, etc., an exotic fauna covers the outside walls of the castle on the facades, stairs and columns. A dog, a frog, a snail and a cat chasing a rat complete the procession. Viollet-le-Duc drew the bestiary of the porch, the main staircase and probably the sanctuary.

=== The porch ===
Under the entrance porch, a Gaelic inscription above the door welcomes the visitor, with "Cead Mile Failte" (One Hundred Thousand Welcomes). On the right side of the door, the hole for aiming at La Rhune is surrounded by a frame with the inscription in Basque: "Ez ikusi — Ez ikasi" (not seen, not learned).

The entrance is defended by two fearsome crocodiles. This animal symbolizes the journey to Abyssinia. A snake is an ambivalent symbol of Muslim culture, hayya evokes the myth of creation, Eve and El Hay, one of the names of God, the Invigorating One.

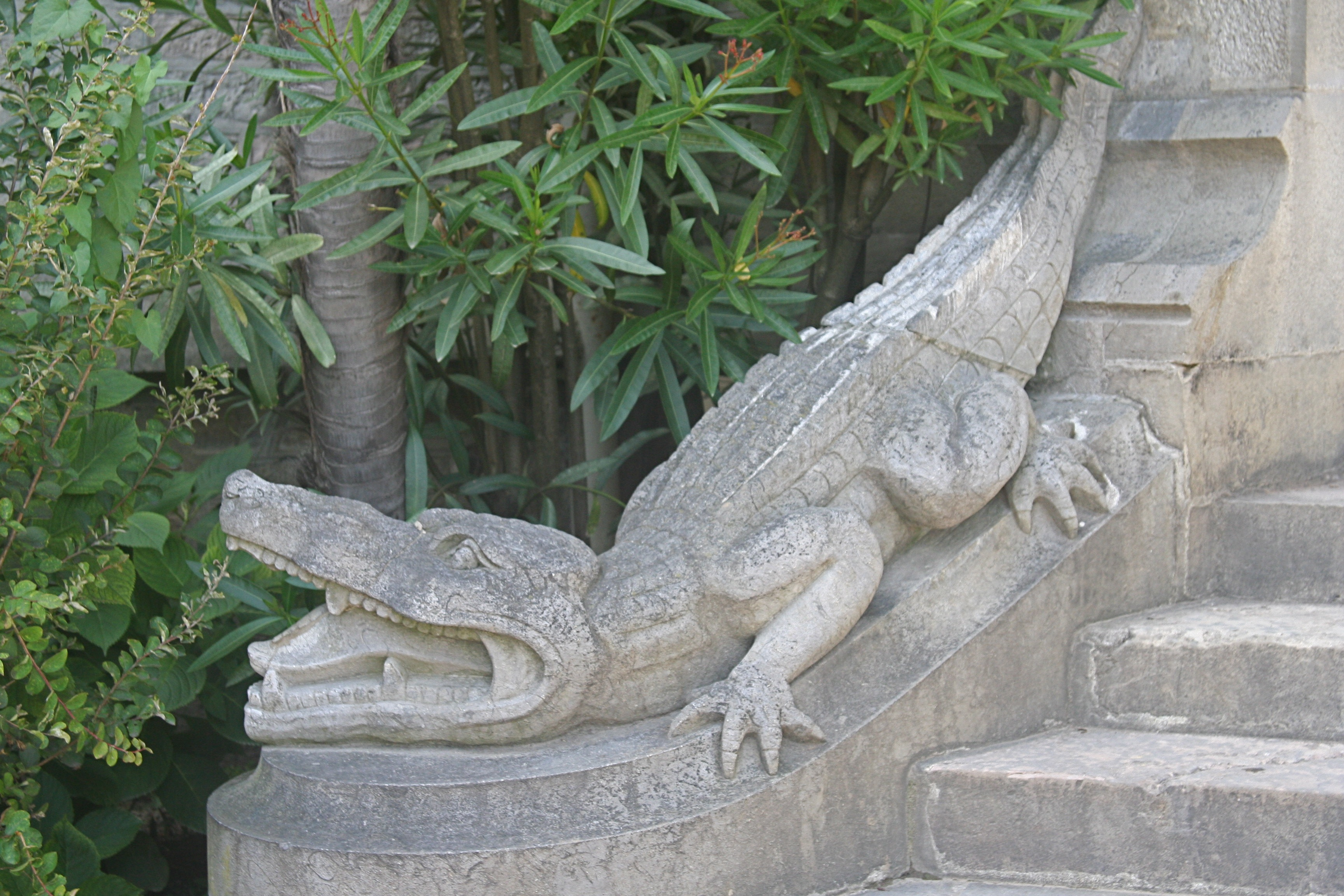
One of the two crocodiles guarding the entrance

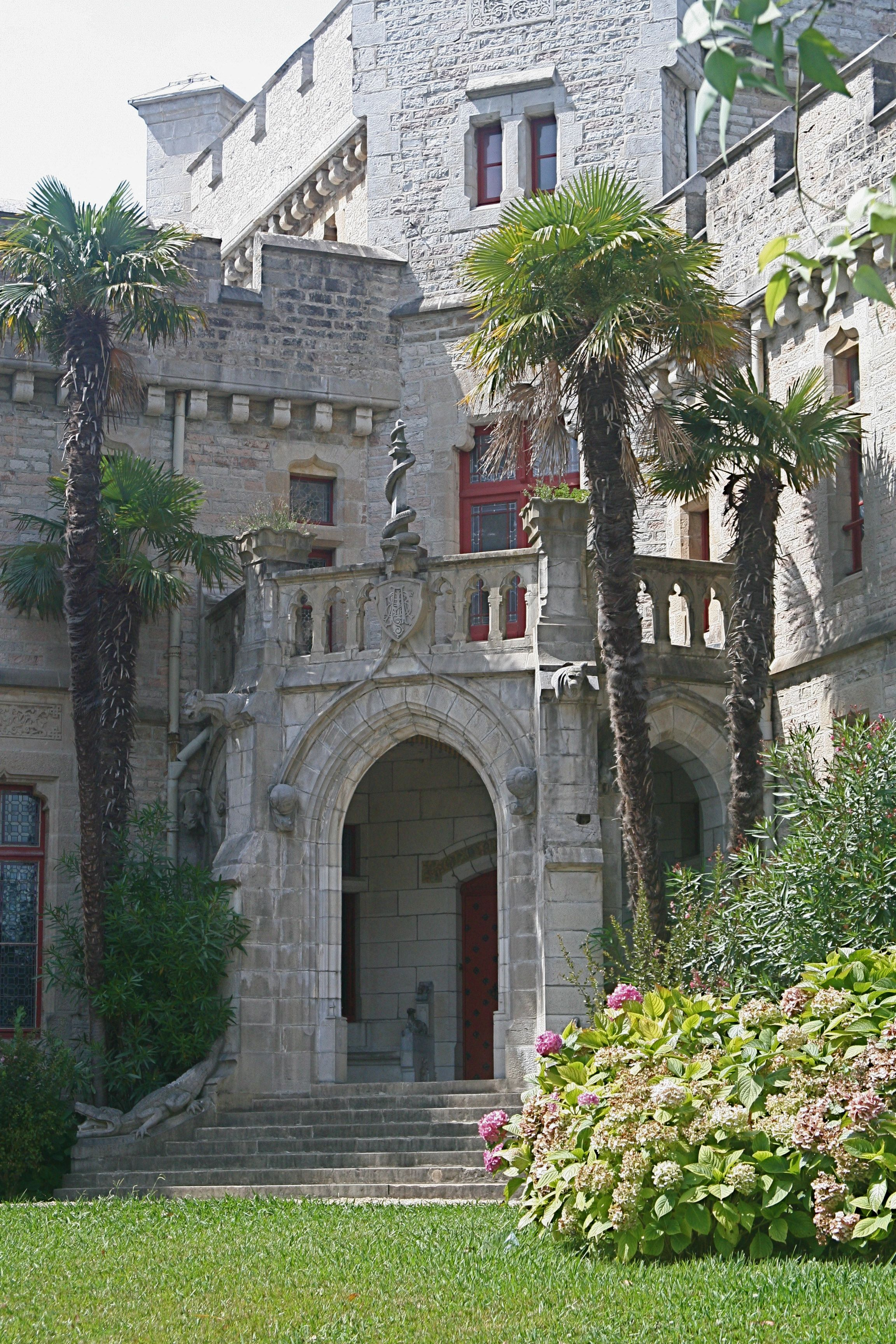
The main entrance

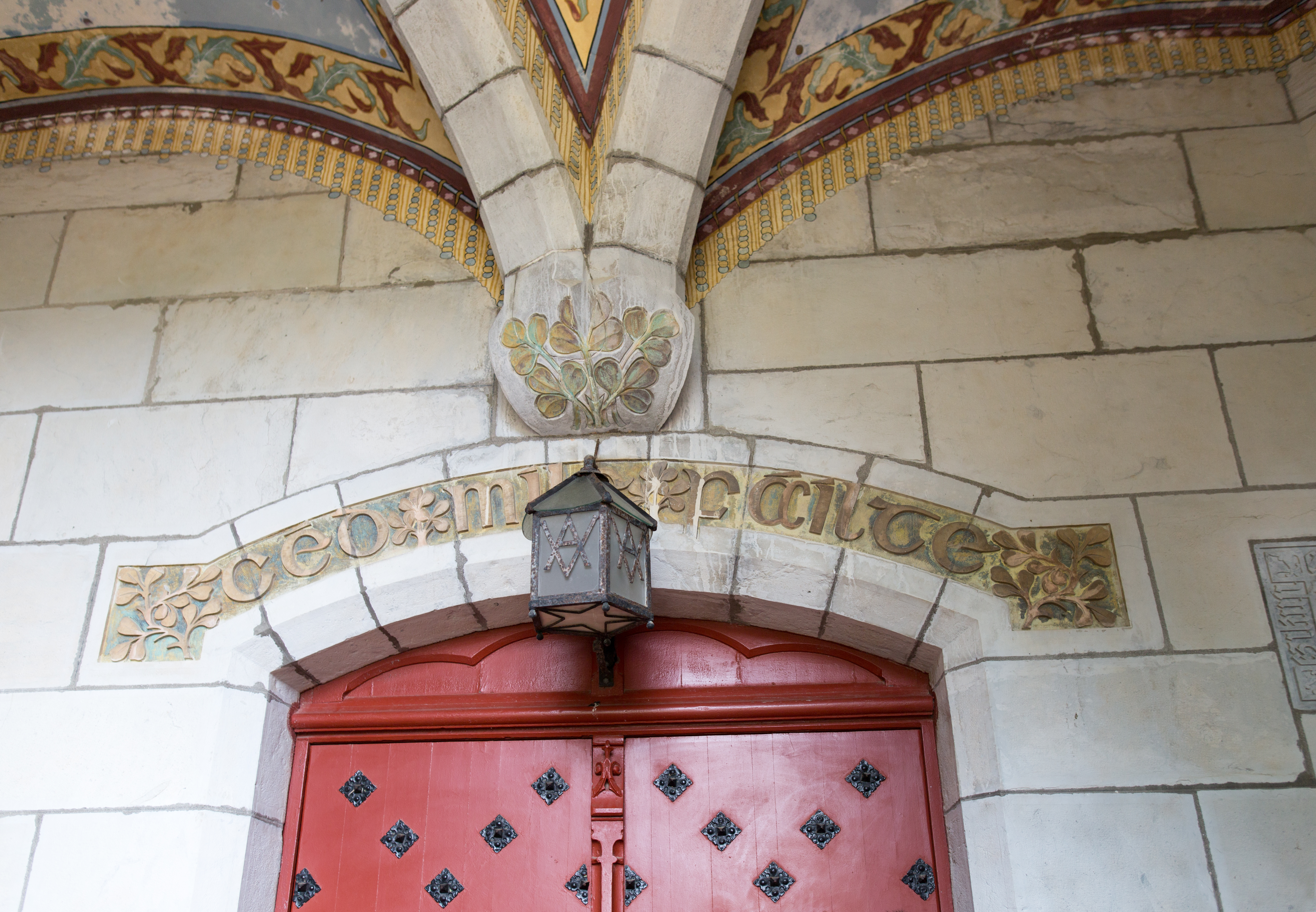
Cead Mile Failte (One hundred thousand welcomes)

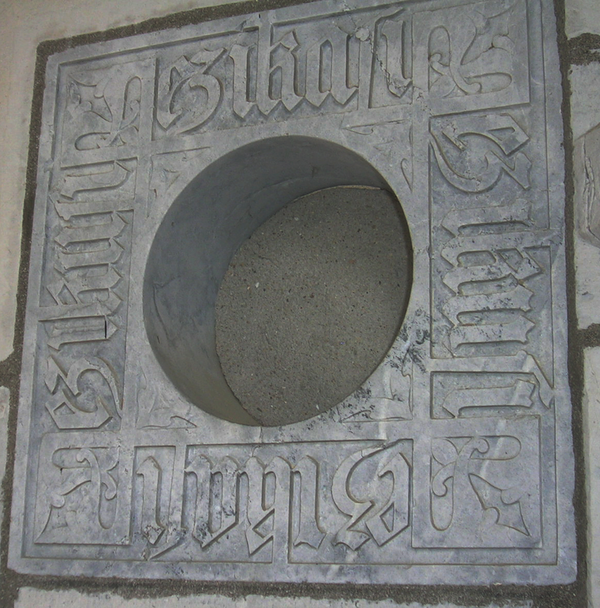
"Ez ikusi - Ez ikasi" (Not seen, not learned)

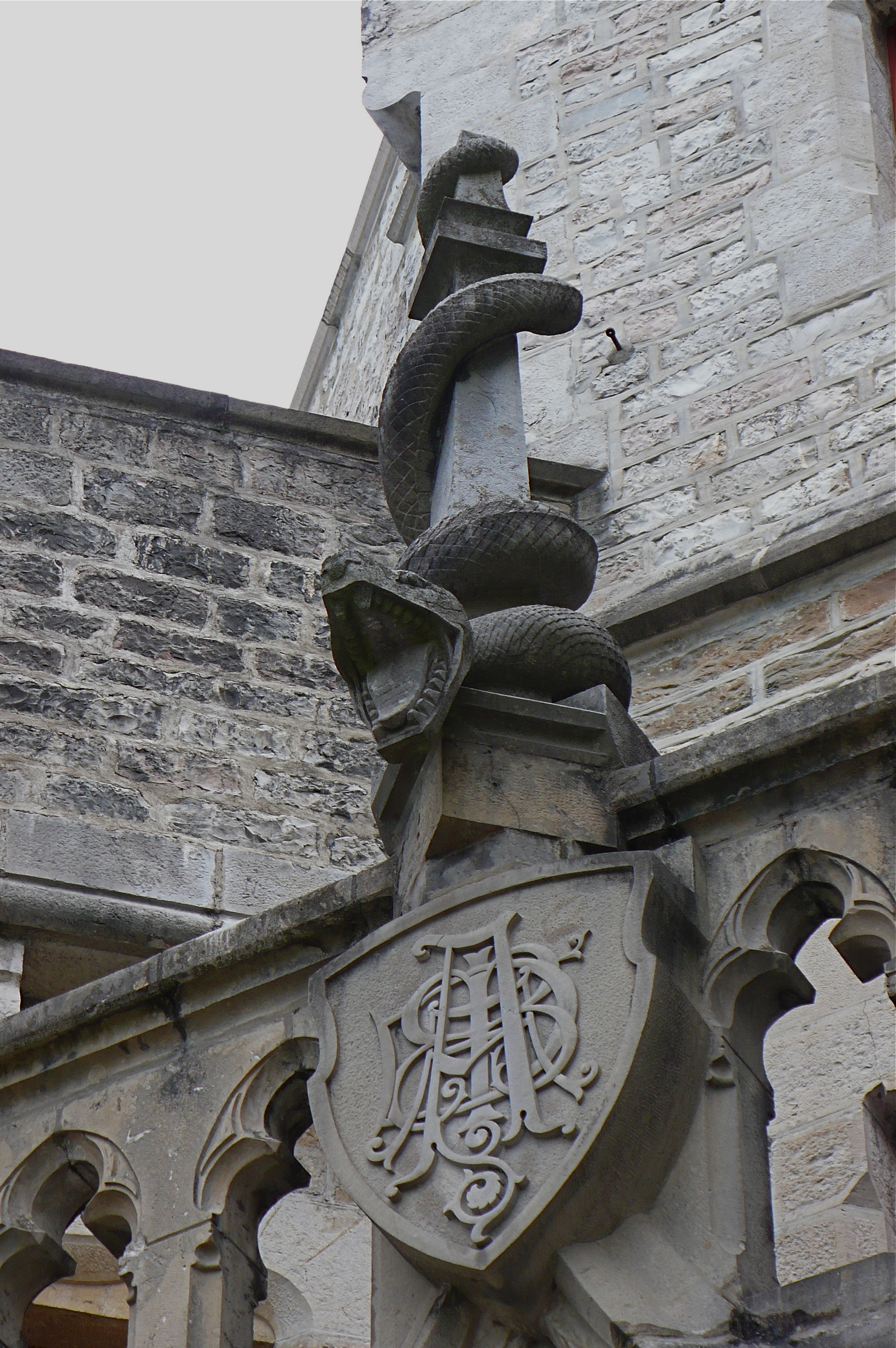
Snake and monogrom guarding the entrance
