= Arae in Numidia =

Arae in Numidia (also spelled Aræ in Numidia) was an Ancient city and bishopric in Roman Africa, which remains a Latin Catholic titular see.

Its modern location is presumed in present Algeria.

== History ==
The city was important enough in the Roman province of Numidia to become one of its many suffragan bishoprics, but like most faded.

== Titular see ==
The diocese was nominally restored in the 20th century as a Latin Catholic titular bishopric (also named Are di Numidia in Curiate Italian).

It has had the following incumbents, of the fitting episcopal (lowest) rank and of the intermediary (archiepiscopal) rank :

- Titular Bishop José Gabriel Diaz Cueva(1964.01.13 – 1968.06.26)
- Titular Archbishop Endre Hamvas (1969.01.10 – 1970.04.04)
- Titular Bishop José Gea Escolano (1971.03.25 – 1976.09.10)
- Titular Archbishop Martino Giusti (1984.05.24 – 1987.12.01)
- Titular Bishop John Gabriel (1988.01.30 – 1989.12.07)
- Titular Bishop Thomas Dabre (1990.04.02 – 1998.05.22)
- Titular Archbishop Paul Dahdah, Discalced Carmelites (O.C.D.) (1999.07.30 – ), Apostolic Vicar of Beirut (Lebanon)

== See also ==
- Arae in Mauretania
- Catholic Church in Algeria
