= Discalced Carmelites =

Catholic religious order

Order of the Discalced Brothers of the Blessed Virgin Mary of Mount Carmel
- Ordo Fratrum Carmelitarum Discalceatorum Beatae Mariae Virginis de Monte Carmelo
- Coat of arms of the order
- Abbreviation: OCD
- Formation: 1562; 464 years ago
- Founder: Teresa of Ávila; John of the Cross
- Type: Mendicant Order of Pontifical Right (for Men)
- Legal status: Institute of Consecrated Life
- Headquarters: Casa Generalizia dei Carmelitani Scalzi, Corso d’Italia 38, 00198 Rome, Italy
- Members: 3,978 members (includes 2,897 priests) (2022)
- Superior General: Miguel Márquez
- Affiliations: Catholic Church
- Website: carmelitaniscalzi.com

The Discalced Carmelites, formally the Order of the Discalced Brothers of the Blessed Virgin Mary of Mount Carmel (Latin: Ordo Fratrum Carmelitarum Discalceatorum Beatae Mariae Virginis de Monte Carmelo) or the Order of Discalced Carmelites (Latin: Ordo Carmelitarum Discalceatorum; abbrev.: OCD; sometimes called in earlier times Ordo Carmelitarum Excalceatorum), is a mendicant order in the Roman Catholic Church with roots in the eremitic tradition of the Desert Fathers. The order was established in the 16th century, pursuant to the reform of the Carmelites of the Ancient Observance, by two Spanish saints, Teresa of Ávila and John of the Cross. Discalced is derived from Latin, meaning "without shoes".

The third order, which is affiliated to the Discalced Carmelites, is the Secular Order of Discalced Carmelites.

The Discalced Carmelites are friars and nuns who dedicate themselves to a life of prayer. The Carmelite nuns live in cloistered (enclosed) monasteries and follow a completely contemplative life. The Carmelite friars, while following a contemplative life, also engage in the promotion of spirituality through their retreat centres, parishes, and churches. Lay people, known as the Secular Order, follow their contemplative call in their everyday activities. Devotion to the Virgin Mary is a characteristic of Carmelites and is symbolised by wearing the brown scapular.

== Background ==
The Carmelite Order, from which the Discalced Carmelites branched off, is also referred to as the Carmelites of the Ancient Observance to distinguish them from their discalced offshoot. It was established in the 13th century in the Holy Land during the Crusades.

All Carmelites, including the Discalced, trace their roots and their name to Mount Carmel in the Holy Land. There, in the 13th century, a band of European men gathered together to live a simple life of prayer. Their first chapel was dedicated to the Blessed Virgin Mary and they called themselves the Brothers of the Blessed Virgin Mary of Mount Carmel.

The Muhraka monastery on the summit of Mount Carmel near Haifa in Israel is a historic Carmelite monastery. The monastery was erected on the place where St. Elijah the Prophet is said to have lived and vanquished the prophets of Baal.

The first Carmelites were pilgrims to Mount Carmel who settled there in solitude. These early hermits were mostly laity who lived a life of poverty, penance, and prayer. Between 1206 and 1214, St. Albert Avogadro, the Patriarch of Jerusalem, brought the hermits on Mount Carmel together into community. At their request he wrote them a rule that expressed their intention and reflected the spirit of the pilgrimage to the Holy Land and of the early community of Jerusalem. They were also inspired by St. Elijah. The words of Elijah, "with zeal have I been zealous for the Lord God of hosts" (1 Kings, 19:10) form the motto on the Carmelite coat of arms, which also depicts his arm bearing a flaming sword in reference to his defeat of the false prophets of Baal. Around 1238, within 50 years of receiving their rule, the Saracens forced the Carmelite hermits to leave Mount Carmel, and they migrated to Europe.

== Foundation of the Discalced Carmelites ==
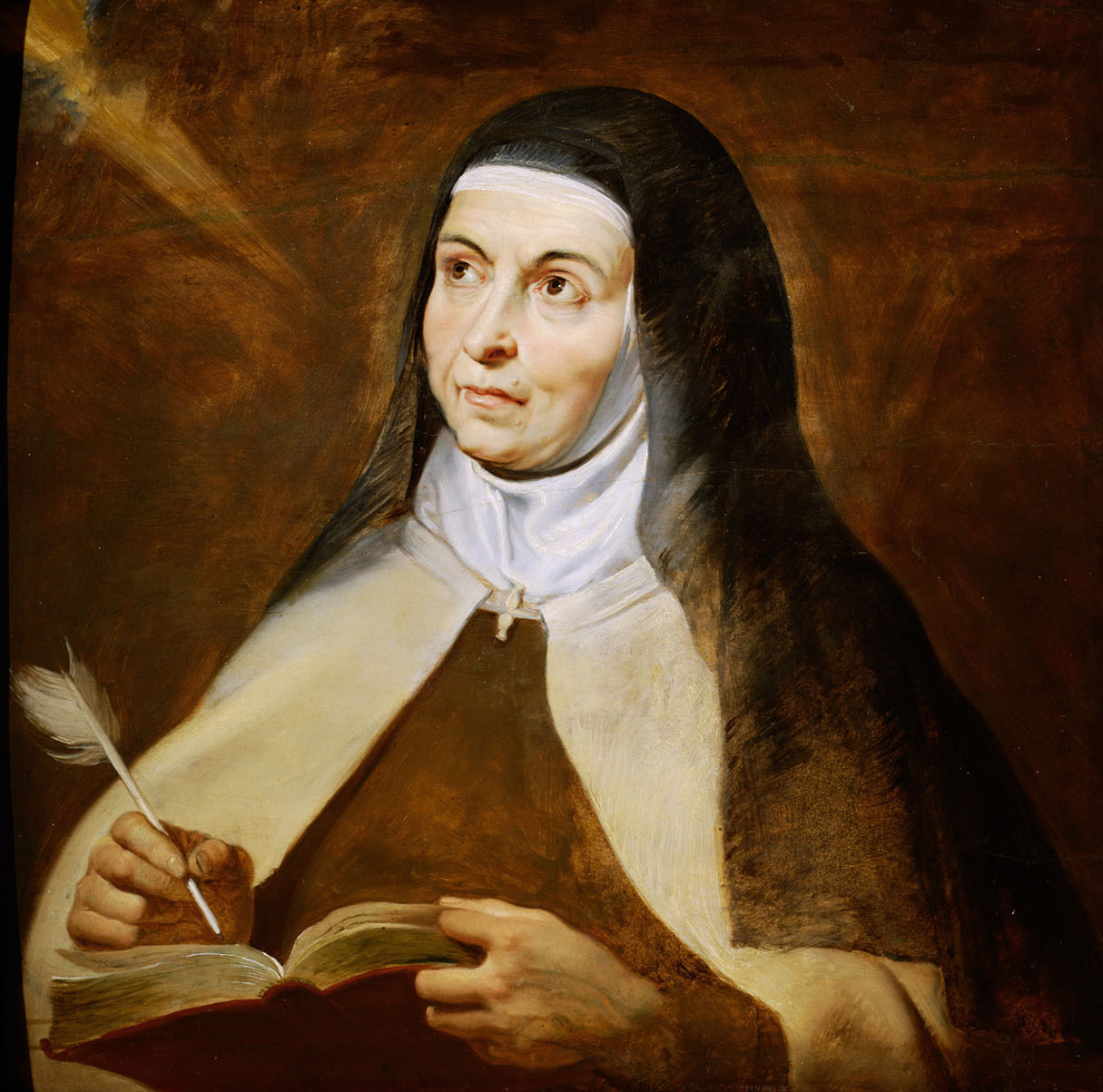
Teresa of Ávila (1515–1582), Doctor of the Church and co-founder of the Discalced Carmelites

A combination of political and social conditions that prevailed in Europe in the fourteenth to sixteenth centuries, including the Hundred Years' War, Black Plague, Protestant Reformation, and Humanist Revival, adversely affected the Order. Many Carmelites, including whole communities, succumbed to contemporary attitudes and conditions that were diametrically opposed to their original vocation. To accommodate this situation their rule of life was "mitigated" several times. Consequently, the Carmelites less and less resembled the first hermits of Mount Carmel.

St. Teresa of Jesus (of Avila) considered contemplative prayer to be the surest means to restore the authentic mission of the Carmelite Order. She wrote that God communicated to her the command to establish a new reformed monastery. A group of nuns assembled in her cell one September evening in 1560, taking their inspiration from the primitive tradition of Carmel and the discalced reform of St. Peter of Alcantara, a controversial movement within Spanish Franciscanism, proposed to found a monastery of an eremitical kind.

With few resources and often bitter opposition, Teresa succeeded in 1562 in establishing a small monastery with the austerity of desert solitude within the heart of the city of Ávila, Spain, combining eremitical and community life. On 24 August 1562, the new Convent of St. Joseph was founded. Teresa's rule, which retained a distinctively Marian character, contained exacting prescriptions for a life of continual prayer, safeguarded by strict enclosure and sustained by the asceticism of solitude, manual labor, perpetual abstinence, fasting, and fraternal charity. In addition to this, Teresa envisioned an order fully dedicated to poverty.

Working in close collaboration with Teresa was John of the Cross, who with Anthony of Jesus founded the first convent of Discalced Carmelite friars in Duruelo, Spain on 28 November 1568.

The Discalced Carmelites were established as a separate province of the Carmelite Order by the decree Pia consideratione of Pope Gregory XIII on 22 June 1580. By this decree the Discalced Carmelites were still subject to the Prior General of the Carmelite Order in Rome, but were otherwise distinct from the Carmelites in that they could elect their own superiors and author their own constitutions for their common life. The following Discalced Carmelite Chapter at Alcala de Henares, Spain in March 1581 established the constitutions of the Discalced Carmelites and elected the first provincial of the Discalced Carmelites, Jerome Gratian. This office was later translated into that of Superior General of the Discalced Carmelites.

== Carmelite charism ==
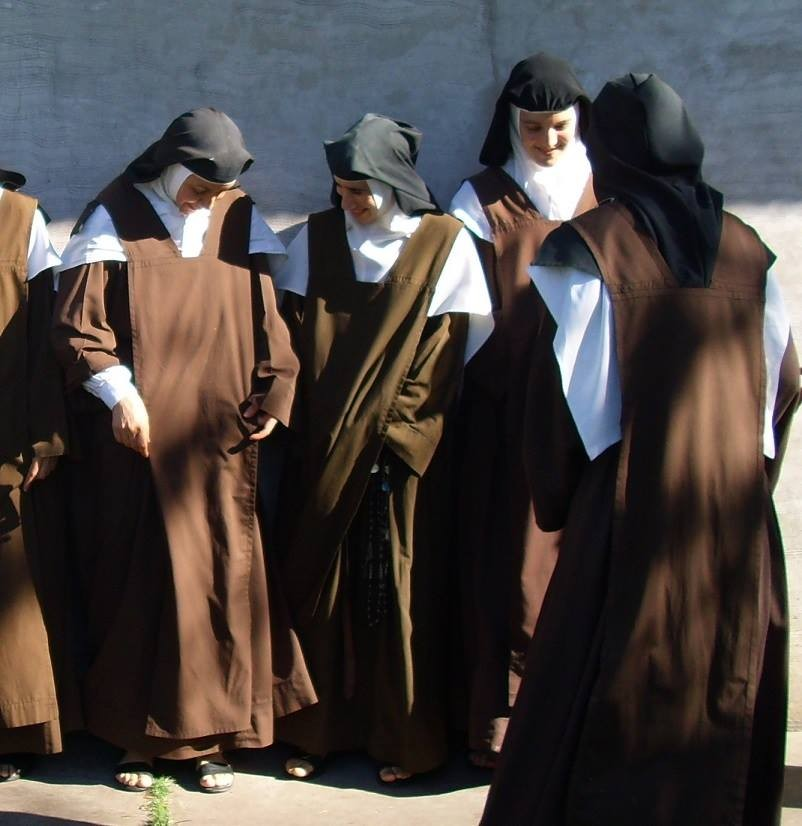
Discalced Carmelites from Argentina

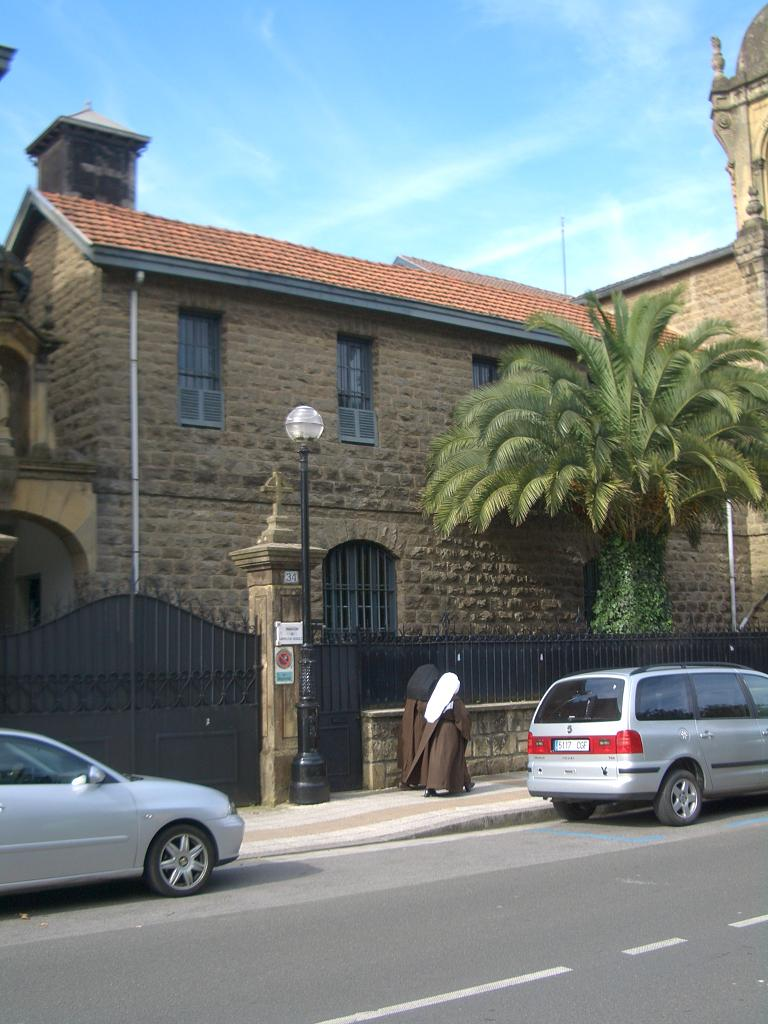
A Discalced Carmelite and a novice outside their convent in Zarautz, the Basque Country (Spain)

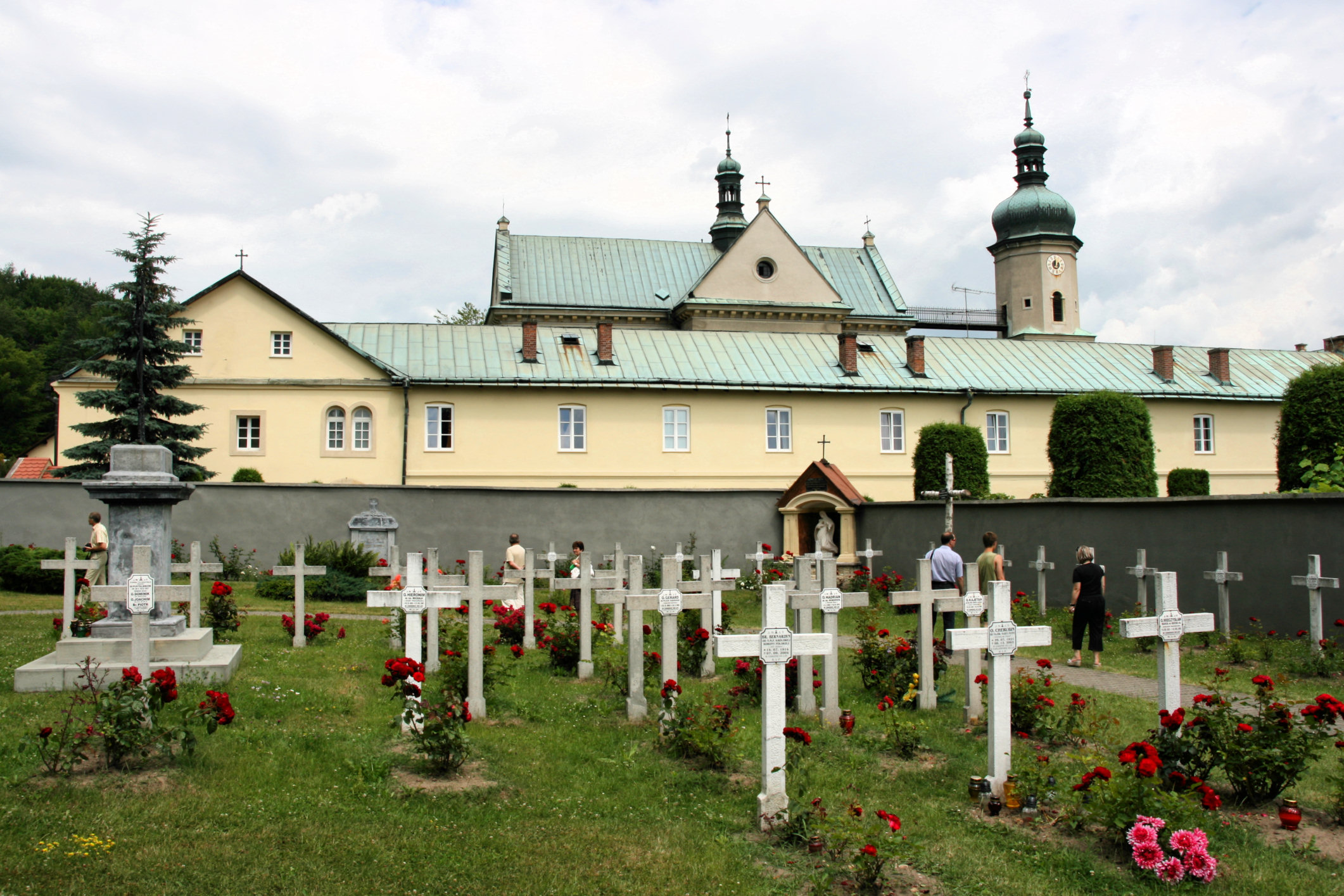
Monastery of Discalced Carmelites in Czerna, Poland

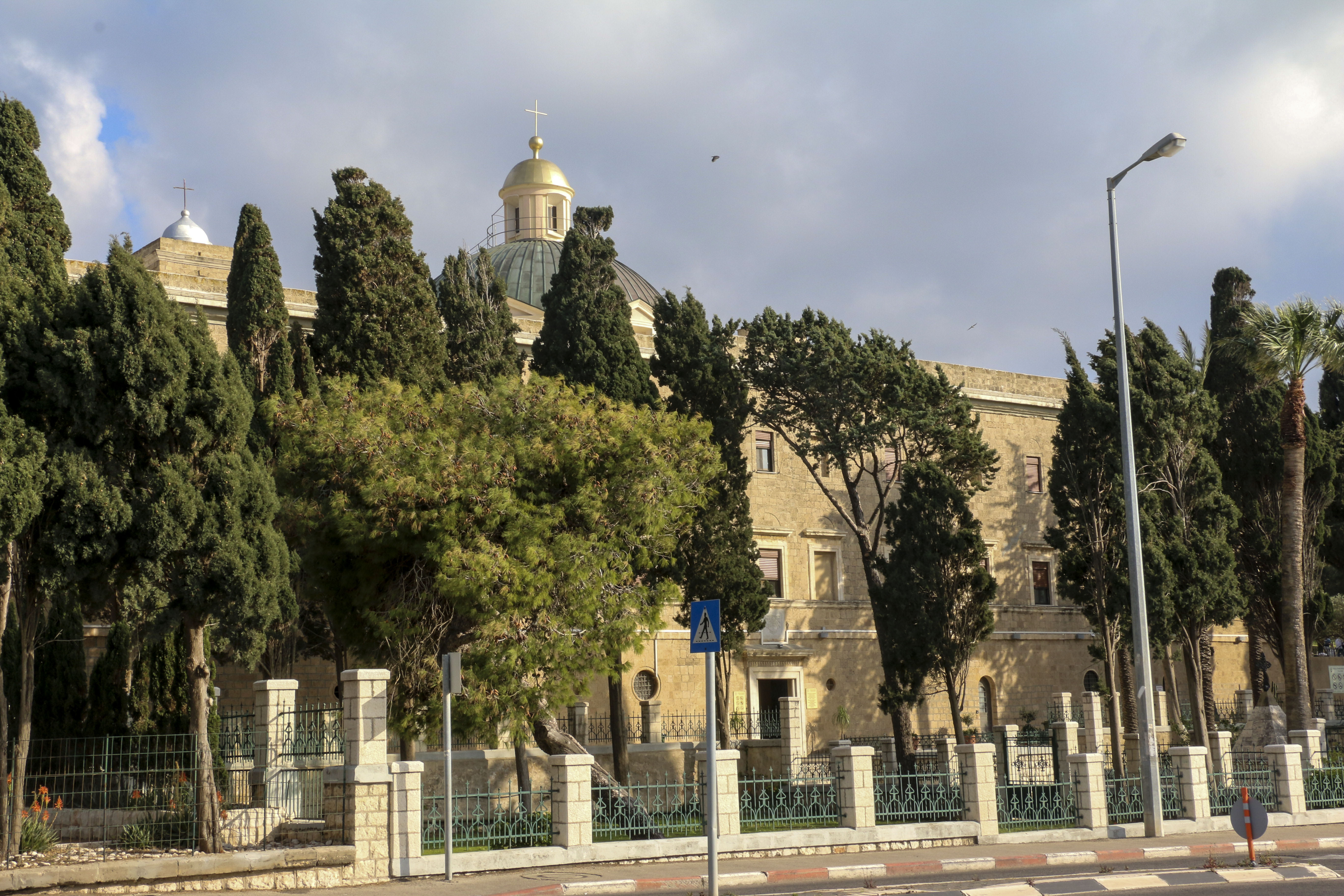
Stella Maris Monastery in Mount Carmel, Haifa

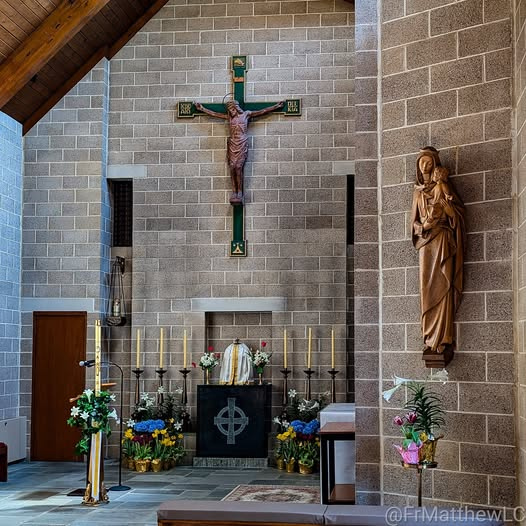
The chapel of the Carmelite nuns in Flemington, New Jersey, USA

The heart of the Carmelite charism is prayer and contemplation. The quality of prayer determines the quality of the community life and the quality of the service which is offered to others. Prayer and contemplation for the Carmelite are not private matters between the individual and God but are to be shared with others since the charism is given for the whole world. Therefore, there is an emphasis in the order on the ministry of teaching prayer and giving spiritual direction.

For a Carmelite, prayer is guided by the teachings and experience of Teresa of Jesus (of Ávila) and John of the Cross, as well as the saints who have followed in their steps, such as Thérèse of the Child Jesus and of the Holy Face, Elizabeth of the Trinity, Teresa of Jesus of the Andes, and martyrs such as Teresa Benedicta of the Cross, and the sixteen Martyrs of Compiegne. Other lights include Br. Lawrence of the Resurrection and Père Jacques de Jesus. Fraternity, service, and contemplation are essential Carmelite principles.

When the Carmelites were forced to leave Mount Carmel, they changed their practice from being hermits to friars. The major difference is that friars are called to serve the People of God in some active apostolate. Some congregations were founded for a specific work, but the Carmelite Order tries to respond to what it sees as the needs of the Church and the world – which differ according to time and place. Many friars work in such institutions as parishes, schools, universities, retreat centres, prisons, and hospitals. Each individual friar will serve in roles depending on the perceived spiritual needs of the people with whom he lives and his particular talents.

Each day is marked by silent, mental prayer. In addition to the daily celebration of the full Liturgy of the Hours, two hours (one in the morning and one in the evening) are dedicated to mental prayer. Communities ordinarily have a maximum of 21 members. The friars practice a broad-based discipline of study.

== Bishops ==
=== Living bishops (4 archbishops, 18 bishops) ===
Current bishops	Former and actual episcopal see or assignment	Current residency	Date of birth (current age)	Appointed to episcopacy
Anders Arborelius	(Sweden) Bishop of Stockholm (1998–Incumbent) (Sweden) (Denmark) (Finland) (Iceland) (Norway) President of Scandinavian Bishops Conference (2005–2015); Cardinal-Priest of Santa Maria degli Angeli (2017-Incumbent)	Stockholm, Sweden	24 September 1949 (age 77)	17 November 1998; Pope John Paul II
Cástor Oswaldo Azuaje Pérez	(Venezuela) Bishop of Trujillo (2012–Incumbent) (Venezuela) Auxiliary Bishop of Maracaibo (2007–2012)	Trujillo, Venezuela	19 October 1951 (age 75)	30 June 2007; Pope Benedict XVI
Silvio José Báez Ortega	(Nicaragua) Auxiliary Bishop of Managua (2009–Incumbent)	Managua, Nicaragua	28 April 1958 (age 68)	9 April 2009; Pope Benedict XVI
Philip Boyce	(Republic of Ireland) Bishop of Raphoe (1995–2017)	(Republic of Ireland) Letterkenny, Ireland	25 January 1940 (age 86)	29 June 1995; Pope John Paul II
Peter Chung Soon-taick	(South Korea) (North Korea) Metropolitan Archbishop of Seoul (2021–Incumbent)	Seoul, South Korea	2 August 1961 (age 65)	30 December 2013; Pope Francis
Paul Dahdah	(Lebanon) Archbishop-Vicar Apostolic of Beirut (1999–Incumbent) (Iraq) Archbishop of Baghdad (1983–1999)	Beirut, Lebanon	8 June 1941 (age 85)	30 May 1983; Pope John Paul II
Brig. Gen. Gonzalo de Jesús María del Castillo Crespo	Military Bishop Emeritus of Bolivia (2012–Incumbent) Military Bishop of Bolivia (2000–2012); Auxiliary Bishop of La Paz (1983–2000)	La Paz, Bolivia	20 September 1936 (age 90)	3 November 1983; Pope John Paul II
Amancio Escapa Aparicio	(Dominican Republic) Auxiliary Bishop of Santo Domingo (1996–2016)	Santo Domingo, Dominican Republic	30 March 1938 (age 88)	31 May 1996; Pope John Paul II
Guy Étienne Germain Gaucher	(France) Auxiliary Bishop Emeritus of Bayeux-Lisieux (2005–Incumbent) (France) Auxiliary Bishop of Bayeux-Lisieux (1987–2005) (France) Bishop of Meaux (1986–1987)	Venasque, France	5 March 1930 (age 96)	27 August 1986; Pope John Paul II
Gustavo Girón Higuita	(Colombia) Bishop of Tumaco (1999–Incumbent) (Colombia) Vicar Apostolic of Tumaco (1990–1999)	Tumaco, Colombia	20 May 1940 (age 86)	8 February 1990; Pope John Paul II
Greg Homeming	(Australia) Bishop of Lismore (2017-Incumbent)	Australia	30 May 1958 (age 68)	22 February 2017; Pope Francis
Zdenko Križić	(Croatia) Bishop of Roman Catholic Diocese of Gospić-Senj (2016-Incumbent)	Croatia	2 February 1953 (age 73)	25 May 2016; Pope Francis
Gonzalo López Marañon	(Ecuador) Vicar Apostolic Emeritus of San Miguel de Sucumbíos (2010–Incumbent) (Ecuador) Vicar Apostolic of San Miguel de Sucumbíos (1984–2010) (Ecuador) Apostolic prefect of San Miguel de Sucumbíos (1970–1984)	Nueva Loja, Ecuador	3 October 1933 (age 93)	2 July 1984; Pope John Paul II
Luis Alberto Luna Tobar	(Ecuador) Archbishop Emeritus of Cuenca (2000–Incumbent) (Ecuador) Metropolitan Archbishop of Cuenca (1981–2000) (Ecuador) Auxiliary Bishop of Quito (1977–1981)	Cuenca, Ecuador	15 December 1923 (age 102)	17 August 1977; Pope Paul VI
Aníbal Nieto Guerra	(Ecuador) Bishop of San Jacinto de Yaguachi (2009–Incumbent) (Ecuador) Auxiliary Bishop of Guayaquil (2006–2009)	Yaguachi, Ecuador	23 February 1949 (age 77)	10 June 2006; Pope Benedict XVI
Marie Fabien Raharilamboniaina	(Madagascar) Bishop of Morondava (2010–Incumbent)	Morondava, Madagascar	20 January 1968 (age 58)	26 February 2010; Pope Benedict XVI
Braulio Sáez Garcia	(Bolivia) Auxiliary Bishop of Santa Cruz de la Sierra (2003–Incumbent) (Bolivia) Bishop of Oruro (1991–2003) (Bolivia) Auxiliary Bishop of Oruro (1987–1991)	Santa Cruz de la Sierra, Bolivia	23 March 1942 (age 84)	18 February 1987; Pope John Paul II
Rubens Sevilha	(Brazil) Auxiliary Bishop of Vitória (2011–Incumbent)	Vitória, Brazil	29 September 1959 (age 67)	21 December 1987; Pope Benedict XVI
Jean Benjamin Sleiman	(Iraq) Archbishop of Baghdad (2001–Incumbent)	Baghdad, Iraq	30 June 1946 (age 80)	29 November 2000; Pope John Paul II
Jusztin Nándor Takács	(Hungary) Bishop Emeritus of Székesfehérvár (2003–Incumbent) (Hungary) Bishop of Székesfehérvár (1991–2003) (Hungary) Coadjutor Bishop of Székesfehérvár (1990–1991) (Hungary) Auxiliary Bishop of Székesfehérvár (1988–1990)	Székesfehérvár, Hungary	15 January 1927 (age 99)	23 December 1988; Pope John Paul II
Rolando Joven Tria Tirona	(Philippines) Metropolitan Archbishop Emeritus of Caceres (2024-present) (Philippines) Metropolitan Archbishop of Caceres (2012–2024) (Philippines) Bishop-Prelate of Infanta (2003–2012) (Philippines) Bishop of Malolos (1996–2003) (Philippines) Auxiliary Bishop of Manila (1994–1996)	Naga, Philippines	22 July 1946 (age 80)	15 November 1994; Pope John Paul II

=== Deceased Bishops (7 cardinals, 14 archbishops, 52 bishops) ===
Name	Episcopal see or assignment	Date of birth and death	Appointed to bishopric
Francis George Adeodatus Micallef	Vicar Apostolic Emeritus of Kuwait (2005–Incumbent) Vicar Apostolic of Kuwait (1981–2005)	17 December 1928 – 3 January 2018 (aged 89)	5 November 1981; Pope John Paul II
Anastasio Alberto Ballestrero	(Italy) Metropolitan Archbishop Emeritus of Turin (1989–1998) (Italy) Cardinal-Priest of Santa Maria sopra Minerva (1979–1998) (Italy) (Vatican City) (San Marino) President of Italian Episcopal Conference (1979–1985) (Italy) Metropolitan Archbishop of Turin (1977–1989) (Italy) Metropolitan Archbishop of Bari-Canosa (1973–1977)	3 October 1913 – 21 June 1998 (aged 84)	21 December 1973; Pope Paul VI
Girolamo Maria Gotti	(Vatican City) Prefect of Sacred Congregation of the Propagation of the Faith (1902–1916) (Italy) Cardinal-Priest of Santa Maria della Scala pro hac vice Title (1895–1916) (Vatican City) Prefect of Sacred Congregation of Bishops and Regulars (1899–1902) (Vatican City) Prefect of Sacred Congregation of Indulgences and Sacred Relics (1896–1899) (Vatican City) Camerlengo of the Sacred College of Cardinals (1896–1897); Apostolic Internuncio of Brazil (1892–1895)	29 March 1834 – 19 March 1916 (aged 81)	22 March 1892; Pope Leo XIII
Giovanni Antonio Guadagni (Nephew of pope Pope Clement XII)	(Italy) Vicar General of His Holiness for the Diocese of Rome (1732–1759) (Vatican City) Camerlengo of the Sacred College of Cardinals (1743–1759) (Vatican City) Cardinal Vice-Dean of Sacred College of Cardinals (1756–1759) (Italy) Cardinal-Bishop of Porto-Santa Rufina (1756–1759) (Italy) Cardinal-Bishop of Frascati (1750–1756) (Italy) Cardinal-Priest of San Martino ai Monti (1731–1750) (Italy) Bishop of Arezzo (1896–1897)	14 September 1674 – 15 January 1759 (aged 84)	20 December 1724; Pope Benedict XIII
Daniel Acharuparambil	(India) Metropolitan Archbishop of Verapoly (1996–2009) (India) Apostolic Administrator sede plena of Cochin (2008–2009)	12 May 1939 – 26 October 2009 (aged 70)	14 June 1996; Pope John Paul II
Antônio do Carmo Cheuiche	(Brazil) Auxiliary Bishop Emeritus of Porto Alegre (2001–2009) (Brazil) Auxiliary Bishop of Porto Alegre (1971–2001) (Brazil) Auxiliary Bishop of Santa Maria (1969–1971)	13 June 1927 – 14 October 2009 (aged 82)	2 April 1969; Pope Paul VI
Paul Bassim	(Lebanon) Vicar Apostolic Emeritus of Beirut (1999–2012) (Lebanon) Vicar Apostolic of Beirut (1974–1999)	14 November 1922 – 21 August 2012 (aged 89)	8 September 1974; Pope Paul VI

== Communities of Discalced Carmelite tradition ==
- Byzantine Discalced Carmelites
- Carmelites of Mary Immaculate
- Monks of the Most Blessed Virgin Mary of Mount Carmel
- Secular Order of Discalced Carmelites
- Sisters of the Apostolic Carmel
- Episcopal Carmel of Saint Teresa

== See also ==
- Book of the First Monks
- Constitutions of the Carmelite Order
