= Nicolas Delobel =

French painter (1693–1763)

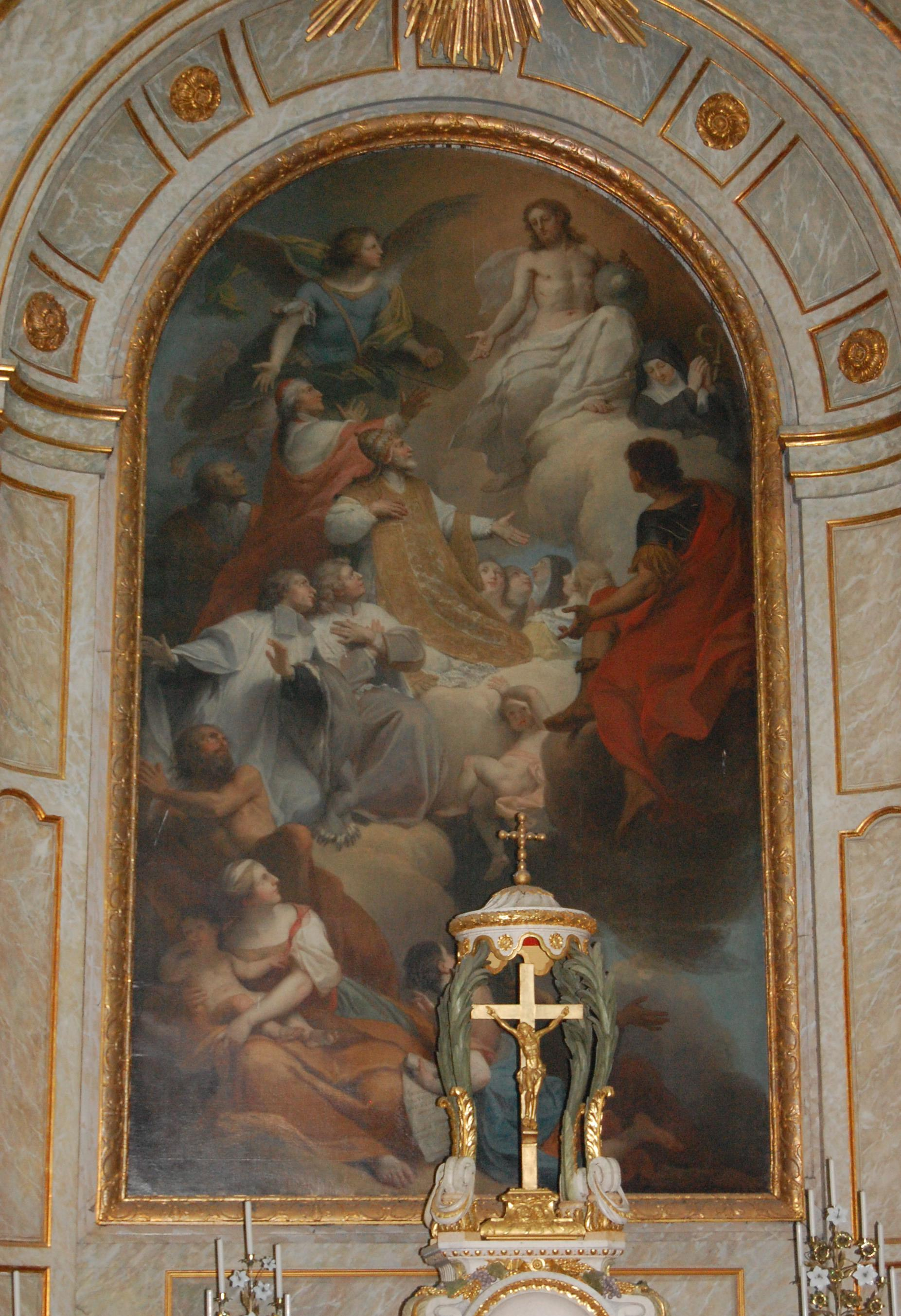
Jesus receiving adorations from the universe, Saint-Étienne Church in Beauvais (1732).

Nicolas Delobel (1693 – 18 March 1763) was a French painter. Under the employ of the French kings Louis XIV and Louis XV, he painted portraits, landscapes, allegories, as well as historical and mythological scenes. He exhibited regularly in the Salon from 1737 to 1753.

== Life ==
His acquaintance with Louis de Boullogne appears to have facilitated his visit to the French Academy in Rome. There he met and became a pupil of Nicolas Vleughels, who became director of the Academy in 1724. He became a friend of the sculptor Edmé Bouchardon, who helped him return to Paris. He was accepted into the French Royal Academy of Painting in 1737. He is known for his vedute of the surroundings of Rome.
