= Paul Bassim =

The Right Reverend Father Paul Bassim, OCD
- Titular Bishop of Laodicea ad Libanum
- Church: Roman Catholic Church
- See: Titular See of Laodicea ad Libanum
- In office: 1974 - 2012
- Predecessor: Giovanni Battista Scapinelli di Léguigno

Orders
- Ordination: 29 June 1946
- Consecration: 24 November 1974 by Archbishop Alfredo Bruniera

Personal details
- Born: 14 November 1922 Zgharta, Lebanon
- Died: 21 August 2012 (aged 89)

Paul Bassim, OCD, (14 November 1922 – 21 August 2012) was a Lebanese bishop of the Catholic Church.

== Biography ==
Bassim was born in Zgharta, Lebanon and as a young man became a friar of the Discalced Carmelites. He was ordained a Roman Catholic priest on 29 June 1946.

Bassim was appointed Vicar Apostolic of the Apostolic Vicariate of Beirut for which he was appointed as the titular bishop of Laodicea ad Libanum on 8 September 1974, and consecrated on 23 November 1974, by Archbishop Alfredo Bruniera. He would hold the position of Vicar Apostolic until his retirement on 30 July 1999.

Bassim was a member of the Conference of the Latin Bishops of the Arab Regions. He was also responsible for the Pastoral Care of Afro-Asian migrants (PCAAM) living as migrant workers in the Arab regions.

Bassim died on 21 August 2012.
