= Laodicea ad Libanum =

Ancient city in Syria

- Location within Syria
- 34.55781°N 36.5196°E
- Location: Syria
- Region: Homs Governorate

Laodicea ad Libanum ("Laodicea by Mount Lebanon") (Greek: Λαοδίκεια ἡ πρὸς Λίβανου), also transliterated as Laodiceia or Laodikeia; also Cabrosa, Scabrosa and Cabiosa Laodiceia – was an ancient Hellenistic city on the Orontes River in Coele-Syria, the remains of which are found approximately 25 km southwest of Homs, Syria (at Kadesh). The city is mentioned by Strabo (xvi. p. 755) as the commencement of the Marsyas Campus, which extended along the west side of the Orontes, near its source. It is called Cabiosa Laodiceia by Ptolemy (Kabiôsa Laodikeia, v. 15), and gives its name to a district Laodicene (Laodikênê), in which he places two other towns, Paradisus (Paradeisos) and Jabruda (Iabmouda). Pliny (v. 23), among other people of Syria, reckons ad orientem Laodicenos, qui ad Libanum cognominantur.

Laodicea ad Libanum is a titular see of the Catholic Church, Laodicensis ad Libanum; the seat was held by bishop Paul Bassim.

== See also ==
- List of ancient Greek cities
- Kadesh – Ancient city (abandoned) in same location
