= Duruelo =

- Municipality
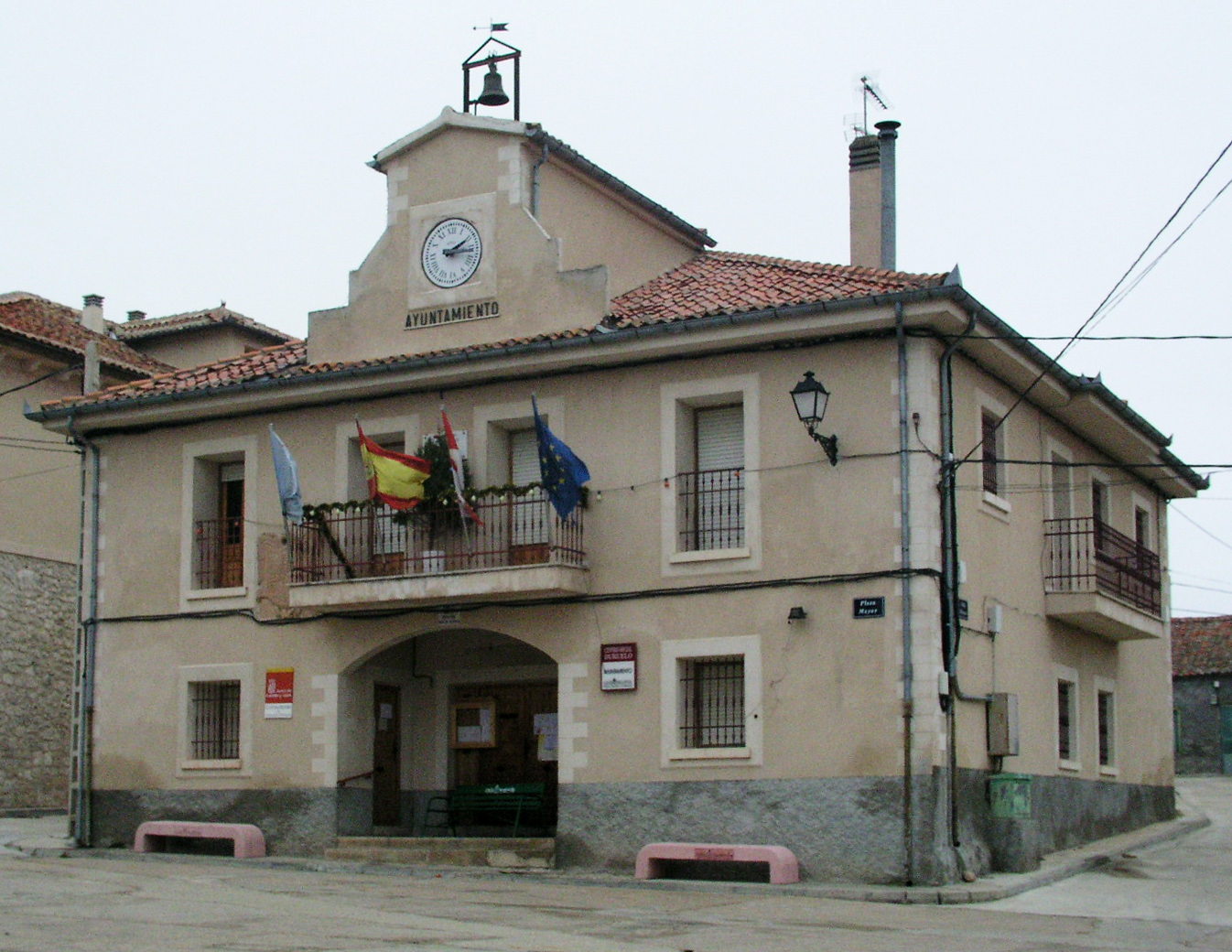

- Flag Coat of arms

- Location in Spain. Duruelo (Spain)
- Coordinates: 41°14′09″N 3°38′55″W
- Country: Spain
- Autonomous community: Castile and León
- Province: Segovia
- Municipality: Duruelo

Area
  - Total: 17 km^{2} (6.6 sq mi)
- Elevation: 998 m (3,274 ft)

Population (2025-01-01)
  - Total: 172
  - Density: 10/km^{2} (26/sq mi)
- Time zone: UTC+1 (CET)
  - Summer (DST): UTC+2 (CEST)
- Website: Official website

Duruelo is a municipality located in the province of Segovia, Castile and León, Spain. According to the 2004 census (INE), the municipality has a population of 136 inhabitants (an hour away from Madrid). The closest river to Duruelo is the Duratón.

Duruelo is the site where a small farm house was converted to house the first monastery of friars of the reformed Carmelites. This primitive, discalced Carmelite community in November of 1568 was one of the first for men begun by Saint Teresa de Jesus. Saint John of the Cross help to convert the old house with a few other monks. Frey Juan de Santo Matia, as he was known formally, changed his name to Juan de la Cruz (John of the Cross) there on November 28, 1568. In two short years, the small farm house became overcrowded and the monastery moved to Mancera de Abajo in June of 1570.
