= Jack Duthoit =

English footballer

Personal information
- Full name: John Duthoit
- Date of birth: 4 November 1918
- Place of birth: Leeds, West Riding of Yorkshire, England
- Date of death: Q4 2001
- Place of death: Boston, Lincolnshire, England
- Height: 5 ft 9 in (1.75 m)
- Position: Full back

Senior career*
Years	Team	Apps	(Gls)
–1945	Carlton United		
1945–1946	Leeds United	0	(0)
1946–1950	York City	36	(0)
1950–????	Boston United		
Total		36	(0)
- * Club domestic league appearances and goals

John Duthoit (4 November 1918 – 2001) was an English professional footballer who played as a full back in the Football League for York City, in non-League football for Carlton United and Boston United and was on the books of Leeds United without making a league appearance.
