= Aimé and Louis Duthoit =

French draughtsmen, designers and sculptors

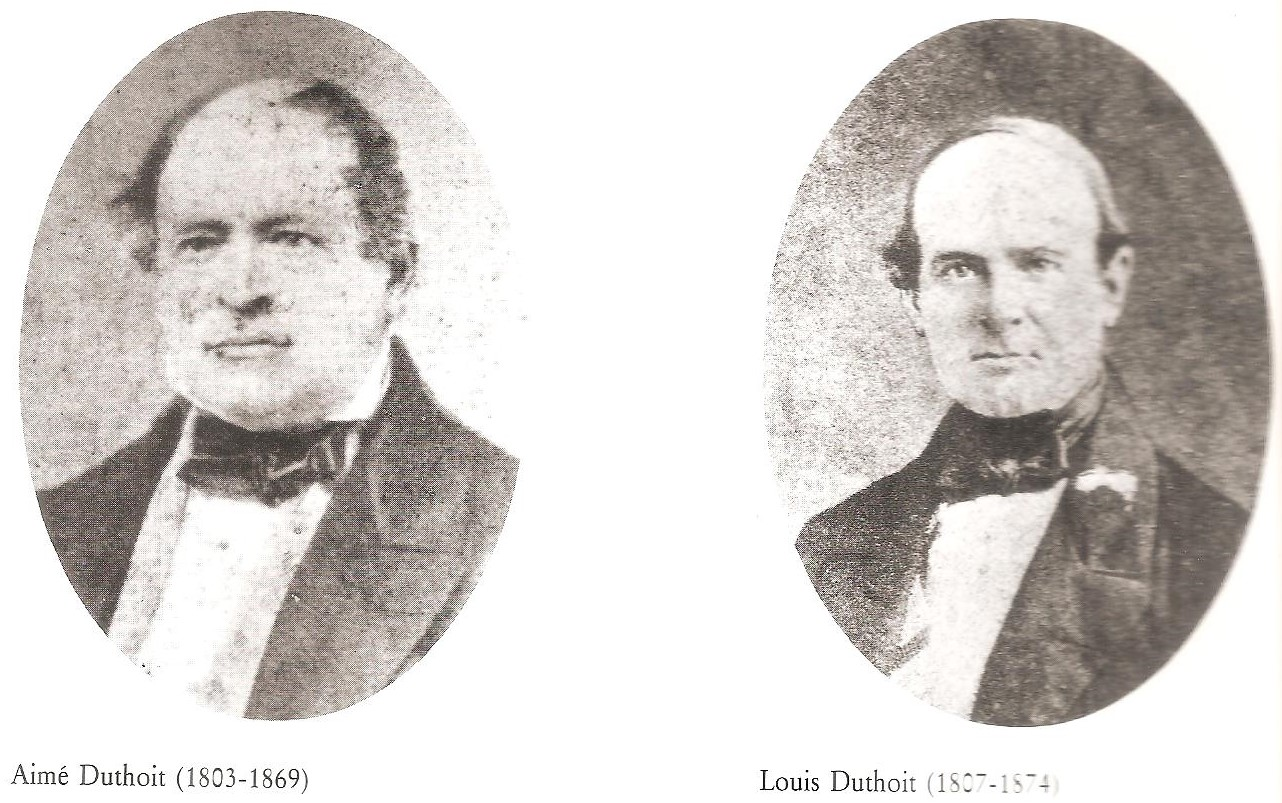
Aimé Duthoit (left) and Louis Duthoit (right)

Aimé (1803–1869) and Louis Duthoit (1807–1874) were French draughtsmen, designers and sculptors. They only ever worked in collaboration with each other and so are known collectively as the frères Duthoit (Duthoit brothers).
