= Saint-Étienne Church (Beauvais) =

Church located in Beauvais, France

Coordinates: 49°25′42″N 2°04′50″E

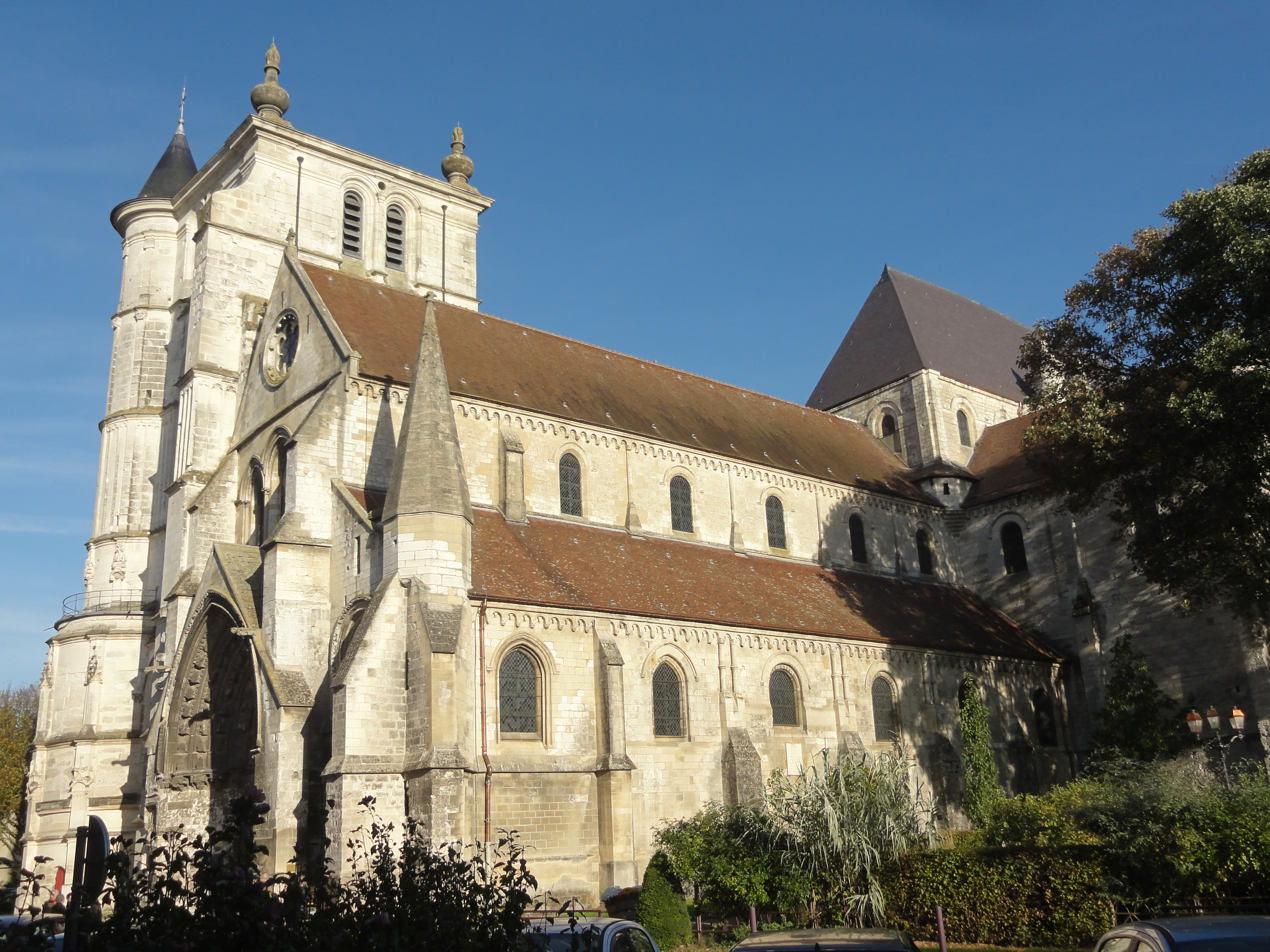

Saint-Étienne Church is a Roman Catholic parish church on rue de l'Étamine in the French city of Beauvais. It was founded in the late 3rd century by Firmin of Amiens and – though its original dedicatee is unknown – it was long dedicated to Saint Vaast d'Arras, with a chapter existing under this title from 1072 to 1742. The present church dates to the 12th century, but even before this was begun it was at the centre of medieval town life and one of the most importrant parishes in the city despite being outside the episcopal city.

Its nave and transepts are Romanesque other than the first two spans of the nave (rebuilt after a late 12th century fire) and the east walls of the transept (largely rebuilt in the 16th century. The nave is on three levels with a triforium. The ogive vaults seem to have been begun around 1120, but it is thought the vaulted Romanesque choir was completed before this date.

Well understood from 1950s excavations, the Romanesque choir was demolished sometime between 1500 and 1525 to make room for a new one in Flamboyant Gothic, rapidly given stained glass windows which survived the French Revolution and are the most notable feature of the church. The church was made a monument historique on 25 April 1846 and a restoration began soon afterwards, but this and subsequent attempts were rarely completed, with the building's overall state getting worse and worse until a general restoration of the nave early in the 20th century. The choir was already a near-ruin by the time of its bombing on 8 and 9 June 1940 and was finally fully restored after 1945.

== History ==
=== Origins ===
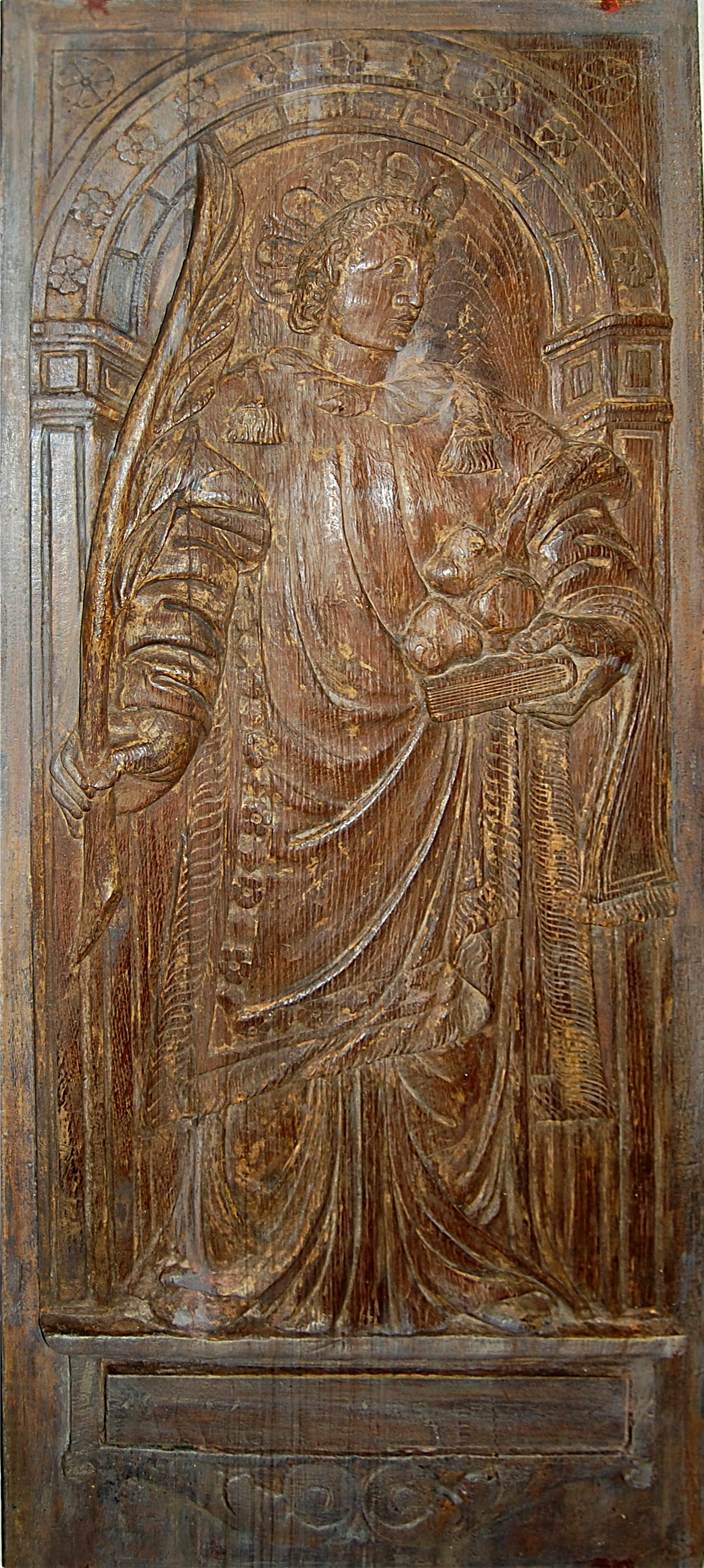
Saint Stephen portrayed on a wooden panel.

According to the ancient traditions of the region, the first church on this site was founded by Saint Fermin. While preaching in Anjou, and learning that Christians in Beauvais were under continual persecution by the Roman magistrates, he came to Beauvais to be of assistance. Not long after his arrival, he was thrown into prison, yet even there he continued to make converts among the pagans. The inhabitants succeeded in gaining his release, and according to legend Firmin converted his place of confinement into a church. In any case, he soon left the village for Amiens, where he was made bishop. This episode, if true, may have happened any time between the beginning of the 2nd century and the end of the 3rd century. The church of Pamplona, where Firmin came from, had always affirmed placed him at the beginning of the 2nd century. In that case, Firmin himself was not involved in construction, because excavations conducted at the beginning of the 19th century demonstrate that much of the site was occupied by Roman baths. The villagers would have built a church at a late date and associated it with Firmin's sojourn among them. If Firmin passed through at the end of the 3rd century, when the baths were already destroyed (during the latter part of the 3rd century), then it's possible the Firmin was involved in founding the church. The church was likely constructed of wood, of which not a trace remains today.

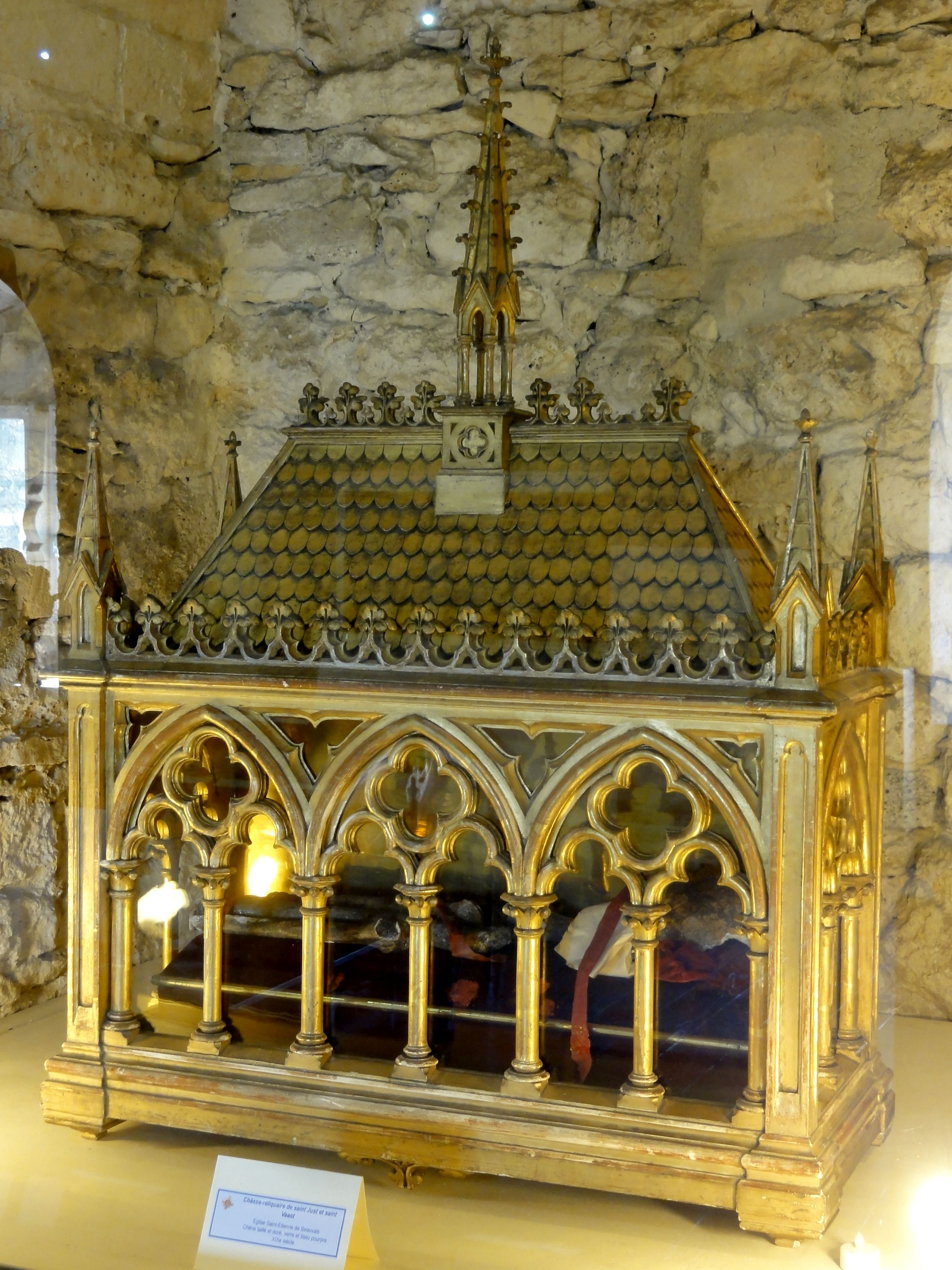
Casket containing relics of Saint Just and Saint Vaast (Pierre Poschadel, 2014).

=== Revolutionary period ===
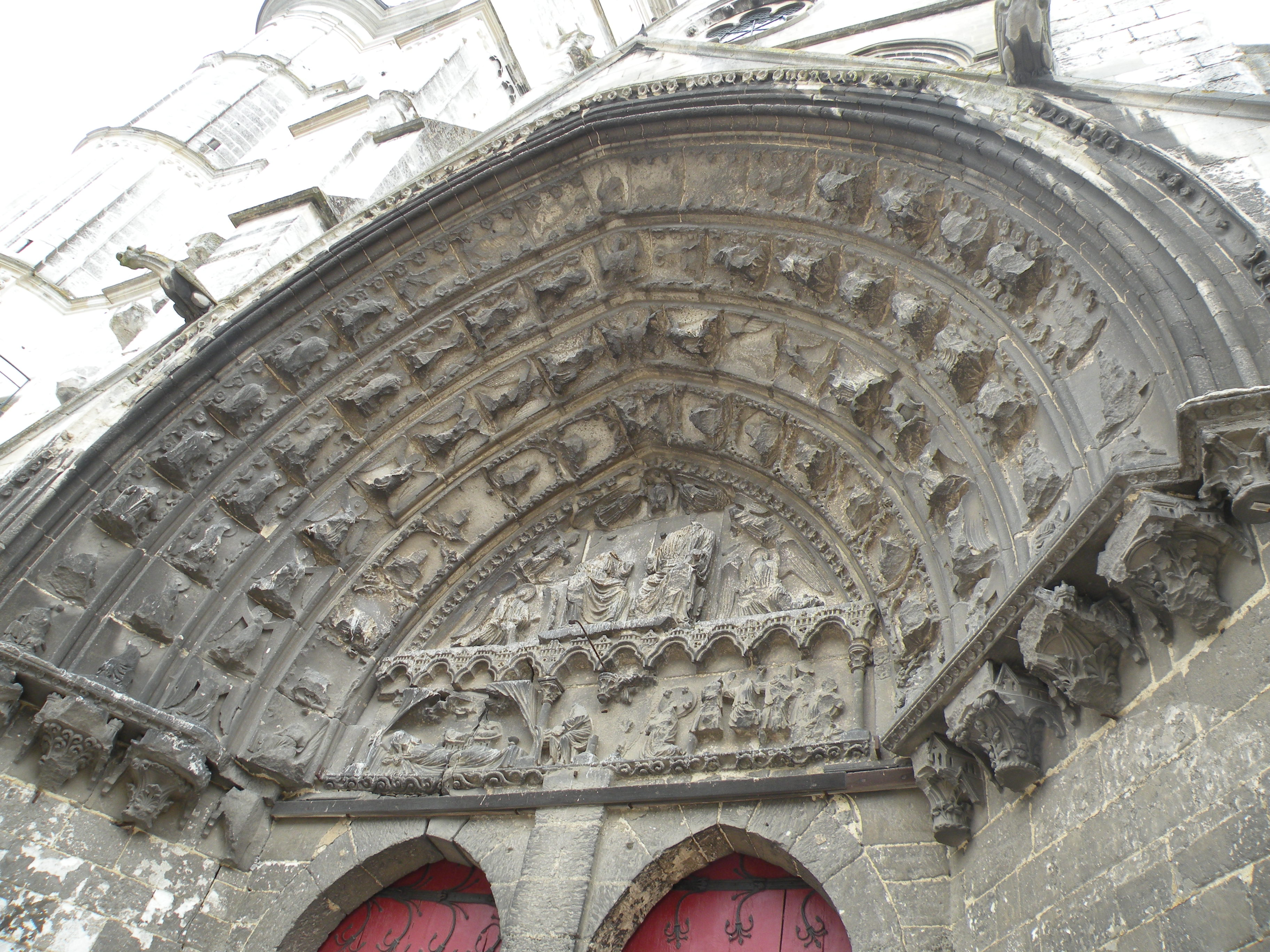
Most of the figurines on the archivolts and tympanum of the western portal were defaced in the fall of 1793

The French Revolution was well received in Beauvais, and to everyone's satisfaction, the bishop was retained. By decision of the municipal council of 29 January 1791, the number of parishes was reduced to four: Saint-Pierre, Saint-Étienne, Saint-Sauveur, and Saint-Laurent, On 4 March, it was decided only to retain the first two parishes. During the month of May, all the other churches were closed, and their furniture was assigned to the surviving churches. Notably, Saint-Étienne thus obtained the altars of the Minimes and of Saint-Michel, which arrived in 1792 and can still be seen in the church. The three vicars of the parish were victims of slander, the objects of harassment, were forbidden to administer the sacraments, and discharged in April, going into exile. The priest was suspended on 1 September because he refused to work with the constitutional vicars that had been sent to him. In August 1793, all the bells except the smallest were sent to be melted down, negating the value of having received the large bells of the Abbey of Saint-Lucien de Beauvais in 1791. No precautions were taken in dismounting the bells, which were simply dropped from the towers regardless of damage caused. Abbot Gauthier, the former priest of Saint-Laurent and priest of Saint-Étienne since June 1793, was arrested in September. The celebration of the mass was prohibited for Sundays and festivals in October. The popular and revolutionary society then set about a violent program of dechristianization, and on 2 October ordered the destruction of all external signs of religion. In response, numerous sans-culottes gathered one autumn day (3 October, or 16 or 24 November) armed with hammers and pickaxes, and went from one church to another vandalizing the sculpted doorways and furniture. At the end of the year, the church was transformed into a storehouse for oats and fodder, and a doorway for wagons was opened under the stained glass window representing the lineage of Jesse, destroying the lower register. The wooden dome of the bell tower was removed.

On Ventôse 3, Year iii (21 February 1795), freedom of religion was reestablished. The parishioners sought to reinstate the church which had now become state property; the state at first suggested that they be contented with the cathedral. On 8 December the parishioners at last regained the church, as well as responsibility for its upkeep and restoration, the authorities having winked their eyes at the extensive and gratuitous vandalism. Thankfully there was a rising public awareness of the artistic treasures of the churches, and the faithful were called to oversee the conservation of the stained glass windows, the value of which the officials in charge of artistic patrimony had begun to recognize. The situation was abysmal. The pipe organ had been stolen, a gaping hole opened where there had been a rose window, the pinnacles of the lady chapel had collapsed, and most of the furniture was broken, but religious services were held again on 1 January 1796. A small group of parishioners dedicated themselves to fully restoring the church to its condition prior to the Revolution, and succeeded in reassembling much of the scattered furniture. The political situation remained hostile to religion, and an order of the departmental administration of 15 September 1799 made it impossible to practice Catholicism in the expected way: mass could only be celebrated on the quintidi (fifth day) and décadi (tenth day) of the decimal week, and on national holidays, and the municipal authorities wanted the churches to stay closed on all other days. The parishioners filed a complaint with Lucien Bonaparte, and finally the restriction on freedom of religion was invalidated. Gradually the time-honored practices revived, and in 1803 the municipal council even assisted with the Easter mass.

== Bibliography ==
- Henwood-Reverdot, Annie (1982). L'église Saint-Étienne de Beauvais: Histoire et architecture (in French). Beauvais: GEMOB, avec le concours du CNRS, de la ville de Beauvais et du département de l'Oise. pp. 1–284.
