= Diocese of Machala =

Roman Catholic diocese in Ecuador

Diocese of Machala Dioecesis Machalensis

Catholic
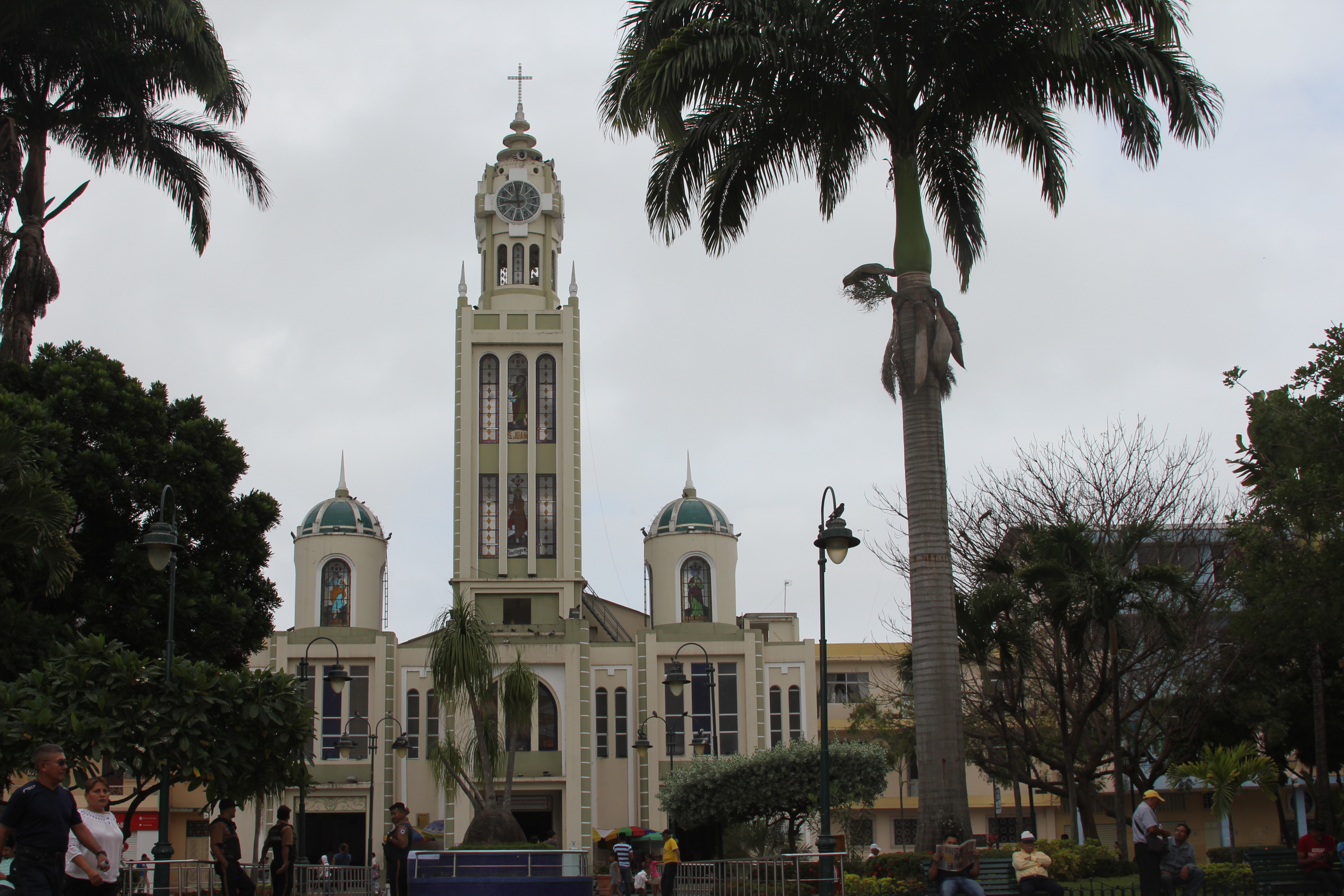

Location
- Country: Ecuador
- Ecclesiastical province: Cuenca
- Metropolitan: Vicente Rodrigo Cisneros Durán

Statistics
- Area: 5,819 km^{2} (2,247 sq mi)
- Population: Total; Catholics: (as of 2004); 512,000; 485,000 (94.7%)
- Parishes: 35

Information
- Denomination: Roman Catholic
- Rite: Latin Rite
- Established: 26 July 1954 (Erected as Territorial Prelature of El Oro); 31 January 1969 (Elevated to Diocese of Machala)

Current leadership
- Pope: Leo XIV
- Bishop: Vicente Horacio Saeteros Sierra
- Bishops emeritus: Luis Antonio Sánchez Armijos, S.D.B. Ángel Polivio Sánchez Loaiza

Map
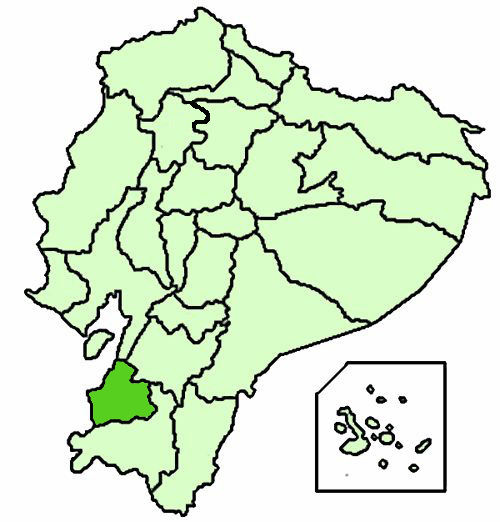

The Roman Catholic Diocese of Machala (Latin: Dioecesis Machalensis) is a diocese located in the city of Machala in the ecclesiastical province of Cuenca in Ecuador. Established on July 26, 1954, as the Territorial Prelature of El Oro from territory of the Dioceses of Guayaquil and Cuenca, it was elevated as the Diocese of Machala on January 31, 1969.

== Bishops ==
Bishops of the Diocese have been as follows:

=== Ordinaries ===
Prelates of the Roman Catholic Territorial Prelature of El Oro

- Bishop Silvio Luis Haro Alvear (1954 – 23 Mar 1955); Apostolic Administrator; previously, Auxiliary Bishop of the Roman Catholic Archdiocese of Guayaquil and Titular Bishop of Antaeopolis; subsequently, Bishop of the Roman Catholic Diocese of Ibarra
- Father Vicente Felicísimo Maya Guzmán (1956 – 29 Nov 1963); Apostolic Administrator; subsequently Bishop-Prelate of El Oro, and then first Bishop of Machala
- Bishop-Prelate Vicente Felicísimo Maya Guzmán (29 Nov 1963 – 31 Jan 1969); Titular Bishop of Comana pontica; previously, Apostolic Administrator of El Oro; subsequently, first Bishop of Machala

Bishops of the Roman Catholic Diocese of Machala

- Bishop Vicente Felicísimo Maya Guzmán (31 Jan 1969 – 30 Jan 1978); previously, Apostolic Administrator and then Bishop-Prelate of El Oro
- Bishop Antonio José González Zumárraga (30 Jan 1978 – 28 Jun 1980); previously, Auxiliary Bishop of the Roman Catholic Archdiocese of Quito and Titular Bishop of Tagarata; subsequently, Coadjutor Archbishop and then Metropolitan Archbishop of Quito, then Cardinal-Priest of Chiesa di Santa Maria in Via, Rome, Italy, and President of the Episcopal Conference of Ecuador
- Father Jesús Ramón Martínez de Ezquerecocha Suso (1980 – 14 Jan 1982); Apostolic Administrator; subsequently, Bishop-Prelate of the Roman Catholic Territorial Prelature of Los Ríos and then Bishop there (Roman Catholic Diocese of Babahoyo)
- Bishop Néstor Rafael Herrera Heredia (14 Jan 1982 – 22 Feb 2010); served as President of the Episcopal Conference of Ecuador
- Bishop Luis Antonio Sánchez Armijos, S.D.B. (22 Feb 2010 – 22 Oct 2012); previously, Bishop of the Roman Catholic Diocese of Tulcán
- Bishop Ángel Polivio Sánchez Loaiza (20 Jul 2013 – 27 Sep 2022); previously, Bishop of the Roman Catholic Diocese of Guaranda
- Bishop Vicente Horacio Saeteros Sierra (27 Sep 2022 – ...)

=== Auxiliary bishop ===
- Hermenegildo José Torres Asanza (2007-2018), appointed Bishop of Guaranda

== Special churches ==
- Cathedral: Catedral de Nuestra Señora de la Merced, Machala (Cathedral of Our Lady of Mercy), which has a permanent chapel for the Adoration of the Blessed Sacrament
- Minor Basilica: Basílica de Nuestra Señora de la Natividad de Chilla, Chilla
