= Néstor Herrera Heredia =

Ecuadorian Roman Catholic prelate (1933–2026)

- Bishop Emeritus of Machala
- Archdiocese: Cuenca
- Diocese: Machala
- Appointed: 14 January 1982
- Term ended: 22 February 2010
- Predecessor: Antonio José González Zumárraga
- Successor: Luis Sánchez Armijos

Orders
- Ordination: 21 July 1956
- Consecration: 14 February 1982 by José Mario Ruiz Navas, Leonidas Proaño and Antonio José González Zumárraga

Personal details
- Born: Néstor Rafael Herrera Heredia; 23 October 1933 Pujilí Canton, Ecuador
- Died: 24 June 2026 (aged 92)
- Education: Pontifical Gregorian University

Néstor Rafael Herrera Heredia (23 October 1933 – 24 June 2026) was an Ecuadorian Roman Catholic prelate. He served as bishop of the Roman Catholic Diocese of Machala from 1982 to 2010.

Herrera Heredia died on 24 June 2026, at the age of 92.

Catholic Church titles
Preceded by Antonio José González Zumárraga	Bishop of Machala; 1982–2010	Succeeded by Luis Sánchez Armijos
