= List of cathedrals in Ecuador =

This is the list of cathedrals in Ecuador.

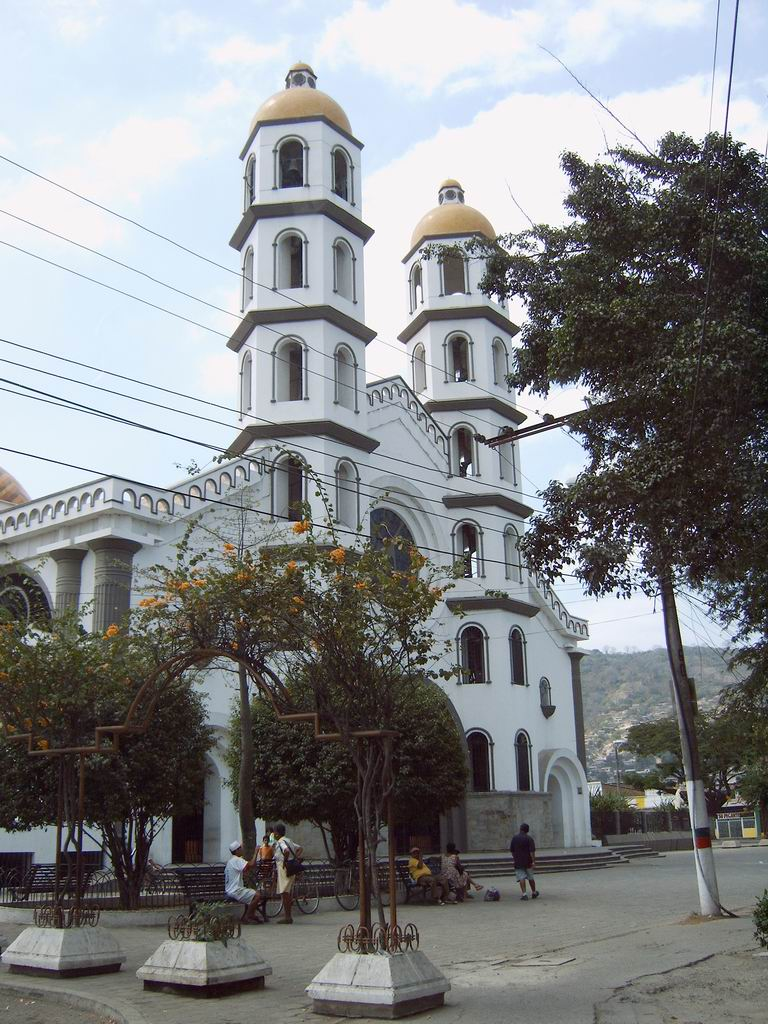
Cathedral of Jesus the Good Shepherd in Portoviejo

== Catholic ==
Cathedrals of the Catholic Church in Ecuador:

- Cathedral Basilica of Our Lady of the Elevation, Ambato
- Our Lady of Mercy Cathedral, Babahoyo
- Metropolitan Cathedral of the Immaculate Conception in Cuenca
- Cathedral of Christ the King in Esmeraldas
- Cathedral of the Immaculate Conception on Galápagos
- Cathedral of St Peter in Guaranda
- Cathedral of St Peter in Guayaquil
- Our Lady of Mercy Cathedral, Machala
- Catedral Purísima de Macas in Méndez
- Cathedral of St Joseph in Napo
- Cathedral of Jesus the Good Shepherd in Portoviejo
- Cathedral of Our Lady of the Rosary in Puyo
- St. Peter Cathedral, Riobamba
- Primatial Cathedral of the Assumption of Our Lady to Heaven in Quito
- Cathedral-Basilica of St. Hyacinth in Yaguachi
- Cathedral of the Ascension in Santo Domingo de los Colorados

== See also ==
- List of cathedrals
