= Clímaco Jacinto Zarauz Carrillo =

Ecuadorian Roman Catholic bishop

The Most Reverend Climaco Jacinto Zarauz
- Bishop of Azogues
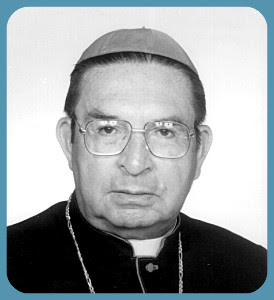
- His Excellency Climaco Zarauz Carrillo, 3th Bishop of Azogues
- Church: Roman Catholic Church
- Appointed: March 2, 1990
- Predecessor: Raúl Vela Chiriboga
- Successor: Carlos Anibal Altamirano Argüello

Orders
- Ordination: June 25, 1950
- Consecration: by Pope John Paul II; Luis Alberto Luna Tobar

Personal details
- Born: Climaco Jacinto Zarauz Carrillo; 24 February 1926 Ibarra, Ecuador
- Died: June 21, 2017 (aged 91)
- Motto: Dominus vexillum meum

Clímaco Jacinto Zarauz Carrillo (Ibarra, February 24, 1926 – Ibarra, July 21, 2017) was an Ecuadorian Catholic priest and bishop, who served as 3rd Bishop of Azogues, between 1990 and 2004.

== Biography ==
=== Early life and priesthood ===
Clímaco Jacinto was born on February 24, 1926, in Ibarra, capital of the Province of Imbabura, Ecuador.

He was ordained a priest on June 25, 1950.

He collaborated with the Azogues headquarters of the Catholic University of Cuenca, and also participated in the construction of several educational units in the Province of Cañar, together with the oblate nuns of the Most Holy Hearts of Jesus and Mary.

=== Episcopate ===
==== Bishop of Azogues ====
===== Episcopal Ordination =====
He was ordained as the III Bishop of Azogues, on April 20, 1990, by the envoy of the Holy Pope John Paul II, the Archbishop of Cuenca, Luis Alberto Luna Tobar.

== Death ==
He died on July 21, 2017, in a retirement home in his hometown of Ibarra, at 91 years of age; due to his advanced age.
