= Our Lady of Mercy Cathedral =

Our Lady of Mercy Cathedral may refer to:

- Our Lady of Mercy Cathedral, Babahoyo, Ecuador
- Our Lady of Mercy Cathedral, Bahía Blanca, Argentina
- Our Lady of Mercy Cathedral, La Serena, Chile
- Our Lady of Mercy Cathedral, Machala, Ecuador
- Cathedral of Our Lady of Mercy, Mercedes, Uruguay

== See also ==
- Our Lady of Mercy Church (disambiguation)
