= Diocese of Riobamba =

Roman Catholic diocese in Ecuador

Diocese of Riobamba Dioecesis Rivibambensis

Catholic
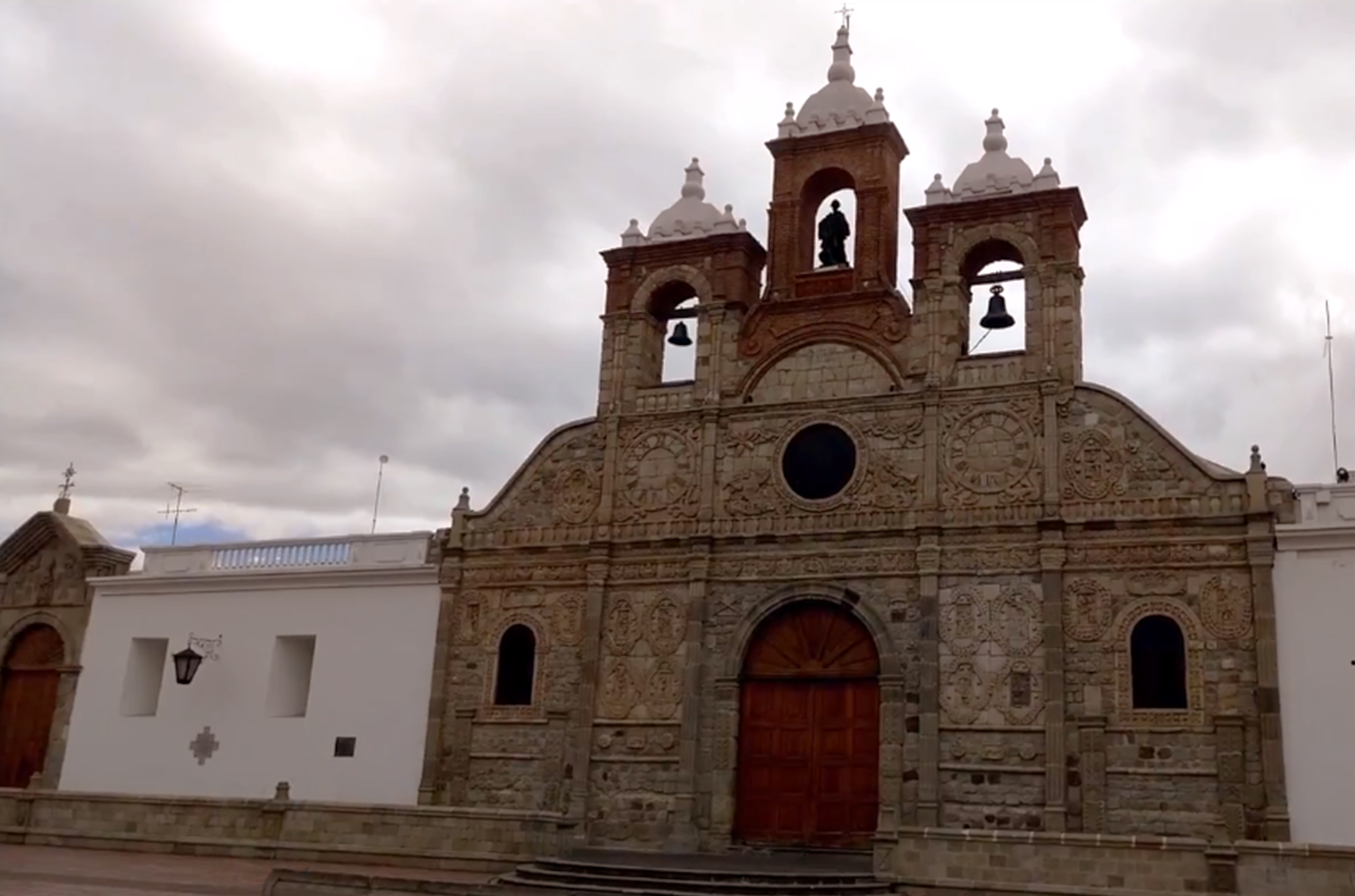
- Riobamba Cathedral

Location
- Country: Ecuador
- Ecclesiastical province: Quito

Statistics
- Area: 7,014 km^{2} (2,708 sq mi)
- Population: Total; Catholics: (as of 2010); 510,000; 399,000 (78.2%)
- Parishes: 56

Information
- Denomination: Roman Catholic
- Rite: Latin Rite
- Established: 29 December 1862 (as Diocese of Bolivar; renamed 25 August 1955)

Current leadership
- Pope: Leo XIV
- Bishop: Bolivar Piedra
- Bishops emeritus: Victor Alejandro Corral Mantilla; Julio Parrilla Díaz

Map
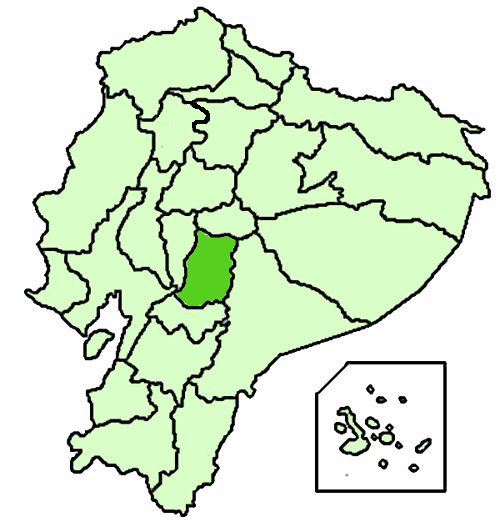

The Roman Catholic Diocese of Riobamba (Latin: Dioecesis Rivibambensis) is a Roman Catholic diocese located in Riobamba, Ecuador. This diocese was erected on 29 December 1862 as the Diocese of Bolivar (Latin: Dioecesis Bolivarensis) from territory of the Diocese of Cuenca. On 25 August 1955, it was renamed the Diocese of Riobamba.

On 28 April 2021, Pope Francis accepted the resignations of Bishop Julio Parrilla Díaz and of Coadjutor Bishop elect Gerardo Miguel Nieves Loja. The diocese had been the subject of charges of financial mismanagement and notable failures of priests to maintain their vows of celibacy. The former auxiliary bishop of Cuenca, Bolivar Piedra, was named Bishop on 21 September 2022.

== Bishops ==
Bishops of Bolivar

- José Ignacio Ordóñez (22 June 1866 – 1879)
- Arsenio Andrade (13 November 1884 – 1907)
- Andrés Machado, S.J. (16 November 1907 – 26 April 1916), appointed Bishop of Guayaquil
- Ulpiano Maria Perez y Quinones (7 December 1916 – 27 December 1918)
- Carlos María Javier de la Torre (21 August 1919 – 20 December 1926), appointed Bishop of Guayaquil; future Cardinal
- Alberto Maria Ordóñez Crespo (5 December 1930 – 7 January 1954)
- Leonidas Eduardo Proaño Villalba (18 March 1954 – 25 August 1955); see below

Bishops of Riobamba

- Leonidas Eduardo Proaño Villalba (25 August 1955 – 20 March 1985); see above
- Victor Alejandro Corral Mantilla (4 September 1987 – 28 February 2011)
- Julio Parrilla Díaz (12 January 2013 – 28 April 2021)
- Bolivar Piedra (21 September 2022 – present)

=== Other priest of this diocese who became bishop ===
- Raúl Eduardo Vela Chiriboga, appointed Auxiliary Bishop of Guayaquil in 1972; later cardinal
