= Hugolino Cerasuolo Stacey =

Ecuadorian Roman Catholic bishop (1932–2019)

Hugolino Cerasuolo Stacey O.F.M.
- Bishop of Loja
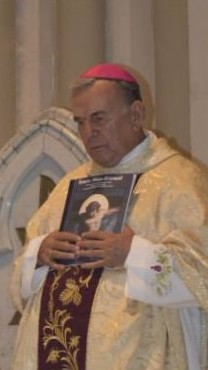
- Hugolino Cerasuolo in 2014
- Church: Catholic Church
- Diocese: Diocese of Loja
- In office: 2 May 1985 – 15 June 2007
- Predecessor: Alberto Zambrano Palacios
- Successor: Julio Parrilla
- Previous posts: Titular Bishop of Valeria (1975-1985); Auxiliary Bishop of Guayaquil (1975-1985); Prefect of Galápagos (1967-1975)

Orders
- Ordination: 29 June 1954
- Consecration: 6 July 1975 by Bernardino Echeverría Ruiz

Personal details
- Born: Félix Vicente Cerasuolo Stacey; 4 April 1932 Guayaquil, Guayas Province, Ecuador
- Died: 24 May 2019 (aged 87) Guayaquil, Guayas Province, Ecuador

Hugolino Cerasuolo Stacey (4 April 1932 – 24 May 2019) was an Ecuadorian Roman Catholic bishop.

Cerasuolo Stacey was born in Ecuador and was ordained to the priesthood in 1954.

He served as prefect apostolic of Galápagos, Ecuador, from 1967 to 1975.

In 1975, he was ordained a bishop and served as titular bishop of Valeria and as auxiliary bishop of the Roman Catholic Archdiocese of Guayaquil, Ecuador from 1975 to 1985.

He then served as bishop of the Roman Catholic Diocese of Loja, Ecuador, from 1985 to 2007.
