= Victor Corral =

Ecuadorian Roman Catholic bishop (born 1936)

His Excellency, The Most Reverend Victor Alejandro Corral Mantilla
- Bishop Emeritus of Riobamba
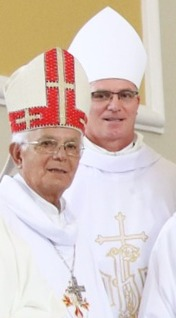
- Bishop Corral from the left in 2022
- Church: Catholic Church
- Archdiocese: Quito
- Diocese: Riobamba
- Appointed: 4 September 1987
- Term ended: 28 February 2011
- Predecessor: Leonidas Proaño
- Successor: Julio Parrilla Díaz
- Other posts: Titular Bishop of Gummi in Proconsulari (1982–1987); Auxiliary Bishop of Riobamba (1982–1987); Apostolic Administrator of Riobamba (1985–1987)

Orders
- Ordination: 15 July 1960
- Consecration: 14 February 1982 by José Mario Ruiz Navas, Leonidas Proaño and Antonio José González Zumárraga

Personal details
- Born: 17 February 1936 (age 90) Guayaquil, Ecuador

Victor Alejandro Corral Mantilla (born 17 February 1936) is an Ecuadorian Roman Catholic prelate who served as bishop of the Diocese of Riobamba from 1987 until his retirement in 2011. He previously served as auxiliary bishop of Riobamba and apostolic administrator of the diocese. His episcopal ministry was marked by pastoral work among the Indigenous peoples of Chimborazo Province and by the continuation of the pastoral initiatives begun by his predecessor, Leonidas Proaño.

== Early life and ministry ==
Corral was born in Guayaquil on 17 February 1936. He was ordained to the priesthood on 15 July 1960. During the following two decades he served in the Diocese of Latacunga, ministering in the parishes of Pangua, Salcedo, and Latacunga. His pastoral work focused particularly on rural and Indigenous communities.

== Episcopal ministry ==
On 14 January 1982, Pope John Paul II appointed Corral auxiliary bishop of Riobamba and titular bishop of Gummi in Proconsulari. He received episcopal consecration on 14 February 1982 from José Mario Ruiz Navas, Bishop of Latacunga, with Bishops Leonidas Proaño and Antonio José González Zumárraga serving as co-consecrators.

After Proaño resigned as Bishop of Riobamba in 1985, Corral was appointed apostolic administrator of the diocese. On 4 September 1987, Pope John Paul II appointed him Bishop of Riobamba.

During his episcopate, Corral continued the diocesan pastoral model developed under Proaño, emphasizing evangelization, social justice and accompaniment of Indigenous communities. The Diocese of Riobamba strengthened its pastoral organization through the creation of pastoral zones and vicariates, expanded the Indigenous Pastoral Vicariate, promoted lay formation through the Diocesan Institute of Pastoral Ministry, established a seminary for late vocations, and completed construction of the diocesan curia. His ministry reflected the pastoral principles of the Second Vatican Council and the Latin American episcopal conferences.

Having reached the mandatory retirement age of 75, Corral submitted his resignation in accordance with canon law. Pope Benedict XVI accepted the resignation on 28 February 2011, and Corral became Bishop Emeritus of Riobamba. He was succeeded by Julio Parrilla Díaz, who took canonical possession of the diocese in 2013.

== Retirement ==
Following his retirement, Corral remained active in ecclesiastical and pastoral life. In 2014 he was awarded Ecuador's National Order of Merit in the rank of Grand Officer in recognition of his service to the Church and the country.

In 2025, at the age of 90, he presented his memoirs in Riobamba. The work reflects on more than six decades of priestly and episcopal ministry, particularly his pastoral service among the Indigenous peoples of Ecuador.
