= Diocese of Ambato =

Roman Catholic diocese in Ecuador

Coordinates: 1°14′30″S 78°37′11″W

Diocese of Ambato Dioecesis Ambatensis

Catholic
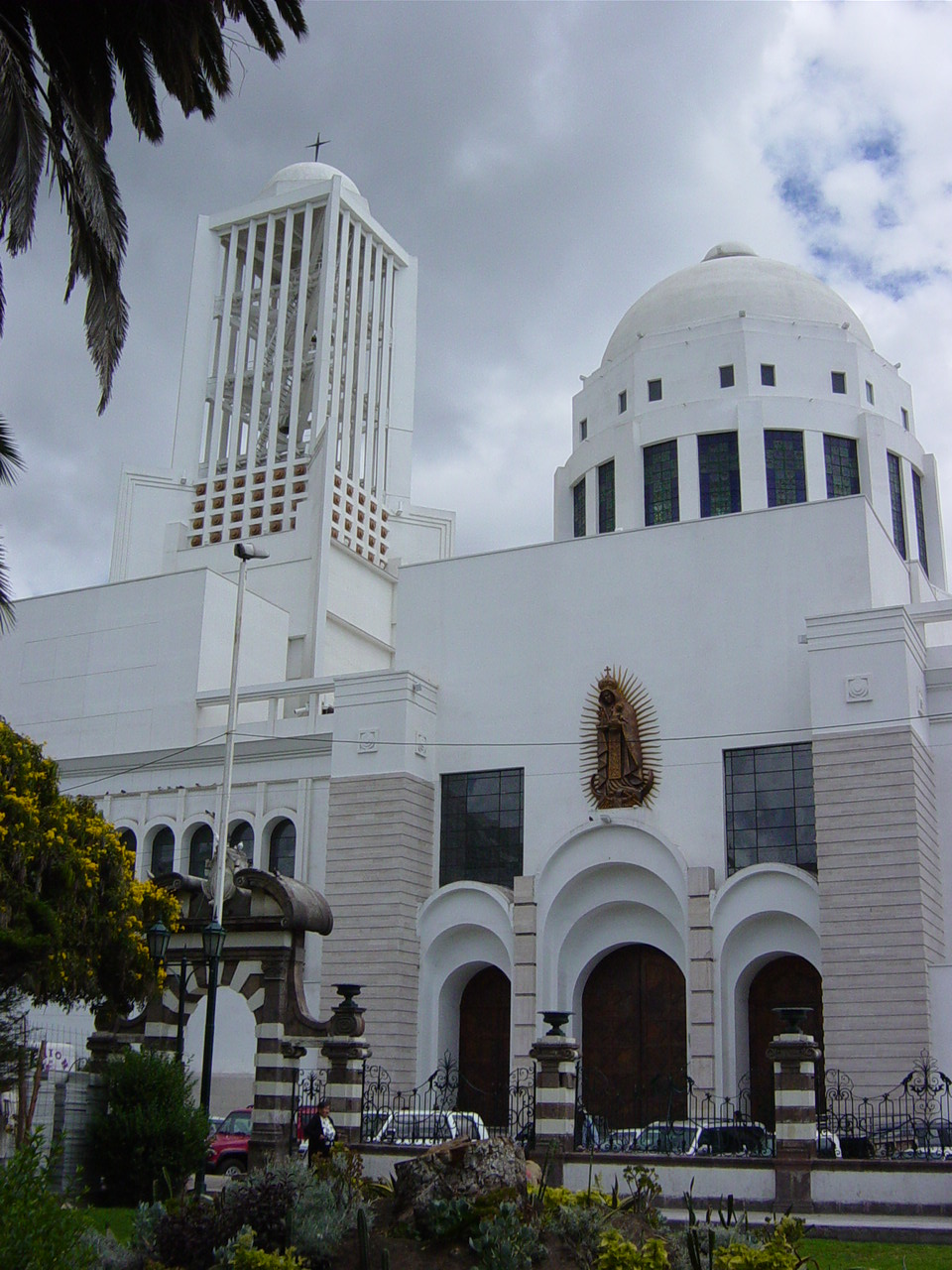
- Cathedral of Ambato

Location
- Country: Ecuador
- Ecclesiastical province: Province of Quito

Statistics
- Area: 3,844 km^{2} (1,484 sq mi)
- Population: Total; Catholics: (as of 2006); 486,193; 425,310 (87.5%)
- Parishes: 48

Information
- Denomination: Roman Catholic
- Rite: Latin Rite
- Established: 28 February 1948 (78 years ago)

Current leadership
- Pope: Leo XIV
- Bishop: Jorge Giovanny Pazmiño Abril, O.P.

Map
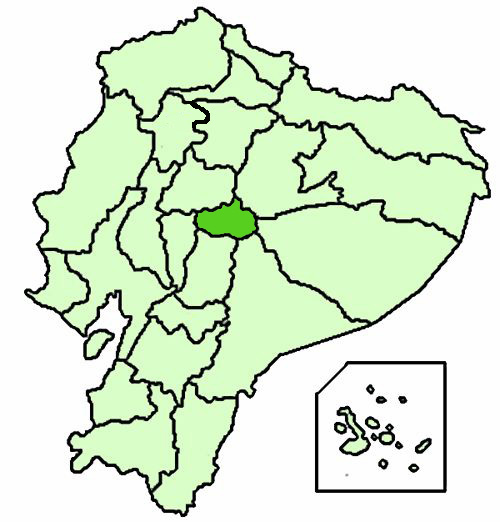

Website
- diocesisambato.org

The Roman Catholic Diocese of Ambato (Latin: Dioecesis Ambatensis) is a diocese located in the city of Ambato in the ecclesiastical province of Quito in Ecuador.

The diocese was created in 1948.

In 2015, the diocese of Ambato served 499,000 local Catholics, with 98 priests, 3 deacons and 217 religious.

== Special churches ==
- Minor Basilicas:
  - Nuestra Señora de la Elevación, Ambato

== Leadership ==
- Bernardino Echeverría Ruiz, O.F.M. (23 Oct 1949 – 10 Apr 1969), appointed Archbishop of Guayaquil; future Cardinal
- Vicente Rodrigo Cisneros Durán (4 Jul 1969 – 15 Feb 2000), appointed Archbishop of Cuenca
- Germán Trajano Pavón Puente (19 Apr 2001 – 20 Jan 2015)
- Jorge Giovanny Pazmiño Abril, O.P. (20 Jan 2015–present)
