= Oswaldo Patricio Vintimilla Cabrera =

Roman Catholic Bishop of Azogues

The Most Reverend Oswaldo Vintimilla Cabrera
- Bishop of Azogues
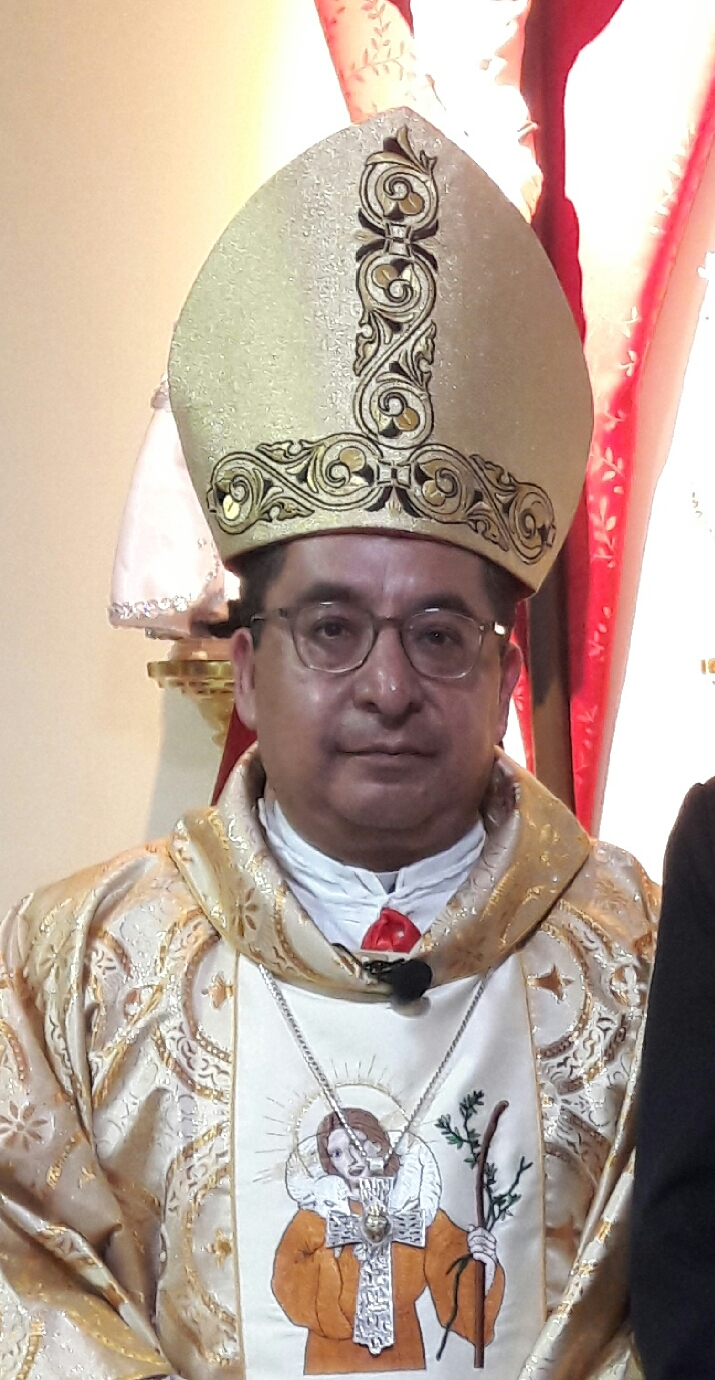
- Church: Roman Catholic Church
- Appointed: August 20, 2016
- Predecessor: Carlos Anibal Altamirano Argüello

Orders
- Ordination: November 17, 1990
- Consecration: by Pope Francis; Giacomo Guido Ottonello

Personal details
- Born: Oswaldo Patricio Vintimilla Cabrera; 2 August 1966 (age 59) Cuenca, Ecuador
- Motto: Adveniat regnum tuum
- Coat of arms

Oswaldo Patricio Vintimilla Cabrera (born August 2, 1966, Cuenca, Azuay Province) is an Ecuadorian priest, who serves as the Bishop of Azogues.

== Life ==
Cabrera was born in the city of Cuenca, Province of Azuay, in 1966 to parents of Azoguean descent.

He completed his primary studies at the Escuela Particular Arzobispo Serrano, and his secondary studies at the Colegio Universitario Miguel Cordero Crespo.

He took degrees in Philosophy and Theology at the Seminario Mayor San León Magno-Cuenca.

== Priesthood ==
He was ordained a priest on November 17, 1990, by the former Archbishop of Cuenca, Luis Alberto Luna Tobar.

The positions held by the current bishop were the following:

- Parish priest in charge of Cumbe and La Victoria del Portete, Cuenca (1990)
- Vicar of Gualaceo (1990–1991)
- Parish priest of San Juan Bautista in Nabón, Cochapata, Las Nieves and the indigenous zone of Zhiña (1991–2001)
- Parish priest in San Felipe in Oña (1995)
- Parish priest of Our Lady of Mount Carmel in Tarqui (2004–2013)
- Pastor of the Holy Spirit in Baños (2013)
- Chaplain of the annexed campuses of the Catholic University of Cuenca (from 1990 to date)
- Religious assistant of the Contemplative Monasteries of the Franciscan Conceptionist Nuns and the * * * Carmelite Nuns, Cuenca (from 1991 to date)
- Chaplain of Telecuenca (current TV Academy) (1994–1996)
- Delegate to the Presbytery Council in the Archdiocese of Cuenca (1993–1996)
- Coordinator of the Liturgy Commission in the Archdiocese of Cuenca (1998–2000)
- Archdiocesan Vicar for Indigenous Ministry (1999–2001)
- Founding Partner of the César Cordero Moscoso Educational Foundation for Development (2002)
- Delegate to the Presbytery Council of the Archdiocese of Cuenca (2007–2010)
- Member of the Pastoral Commission of the Traveler Child (2008)
- Coordinator of the Liturgy Commission in the Archdiocese of Cuenca (2012–2014)

== Episcopate ==
=== Bishop of Azogues ===
On 20 August 2016, he was ordained the fifth Bishop of Azogues in Cañar Province by the Apostolic Nuncio to Ecuador, Mons. Giacomo Guido Ottonello, following his appointment to the same position on 25 June 2016.

=== Works ===
Alongside the process of him carrying out the modernization of the Cathedral of Azogues, he is also the composer of the famous song Niño Manuelito and at the same time, the promoter of the festival that takes place on the second Sunday of January of each year.
