= Jesús Ramón Martínez de Ezquerecocha Suso =

Spanish-born Ecuadorian Roman Catholic bishop

- Bishop of Babahoyo
- Native name: Jesus Ramon Martinez de Ezkerekotxa Suso
- Church: Catholic Church
- Diocese: Diocese of Babahoyo
- In office: 28 June 1984 – 27 March 2008
- Predecessor: Victor Garaigordóbil Berrizbeitia
- Successor: Fausto Trávez Trávez

Orders
- Ordination: 9 August 1959
- Consecration: 15 October 1994 by Victor Garaigordóbil Berrizbeitia

Personal details
- Born: 31 August 1935 Jungitu, Basque Country, Spanish Republic
- Died: 16 February 2013 (aged 77)

Jesús Ramón Martínez de Ezquerecocha Suso (31 August 1935 − 16 February 2013) was a Spanish-born Ecuadorian Roman Catholic bishop.

Born in Spain and ordained to the priesthood on 9 August 1959, Martínez de Ezquerecocha Suso was named bishop of the Roman Catholic Diocese of Babahoyo, Ecuador on 28 June 1984 and resigned on 27 March 2008.
