= Roman Catholic Diocese of Loja =

Roman Catholic diocese in Ecuador

Coordinates: 3°59′0″S 79°12′0″W

Diocese of Loja Dioecesis Loianus

Catholic

Location
- Country: Ecuador
- Ecclesiastical province: Cuenca
- Metropolitan: Vicente Rodrigo Cisneros Durán

Statistics
- Area: 11,476 km^{2} (4,431 sq mi)
- Population: Total; Catholics: (as of 2004); 552,031; 523,442 (94.8%)
- Parishes: 78

Information
- Denomination: Roman Catholic
- Rite: Latin Rite
- Established: 29 December 1862 (163 years ago)

Current leadership
- Pope: Leo XIV
- Bishop: Walter Jehová Heras Segarra, O.F.M.

Map
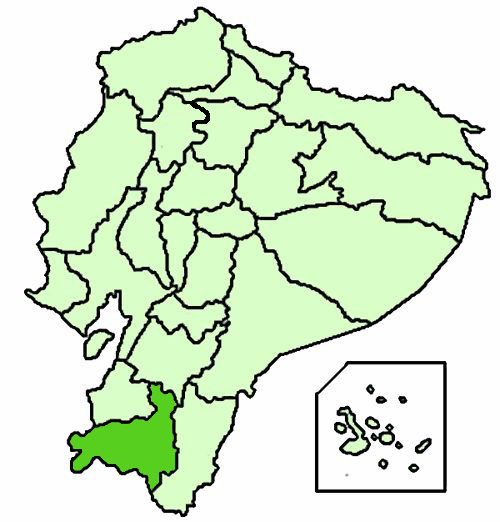

The Roman Catholic Diocese of Loja (Latin: Dioecesis Loianus) is a diocese located in the city of Loja in the ecclesiastical province of Cuenca in Ecuador. It was erected on 29 December 1862 from territory of the Diocese of Cuenca.

== Ordinaries ==
- José María Massia, O.F.M. (17 Sep 1875 – 1902)
- Juan José Antonio Eguiguren-Escudero (6 Mar 1907 – 15 Jan 1911)
- Carlos María Javier de la Torre (30 Dec 1911 – 21 Aug 1919), appointed Bishop of Bolivar; future Cardinal
- Guillermo José Harris Morales (7 May 1920 – 1944)
- Nicanor Roberto Aguirre Baus (23 Oct 1945 – 10 Oct 1956)
- Juán Maria Riofrio, O.P. (10 Oct 1956 – 24 Jun 1963)
- Luis Alfonso Crespo Chiriboga (2 Nov 1963 – 21 Sep 1972)
- Alberto Zambrano Palacios, O.P. (11 Dec 1972 – 2 May 1985)
- Hugolino Cerasuolo Stacey, O.F.M. (2 May 1985 – 15 Jun 2007)
- Julio Parrilla Díaz (18 Apr 2008 – 12 January 2013)
- Alfredo José Espinoza Mateus, S.D.B. (20 December 2013 – 5 April 2019), appointed Archbishop of Quito
- Walter Jehová Heras Segarra, O.F.M. (31 Oct 2019 - )

== Special churches ==
- National Shrine: Santuario Nacional de Nuestra Señora del Cisne in El Cisne
