= Santuario Nacional Eucarístico de Cañar =

Santuario Eucarístico Nacional de Cañar
- Santuario Diocesano Eucarístico San Antonio
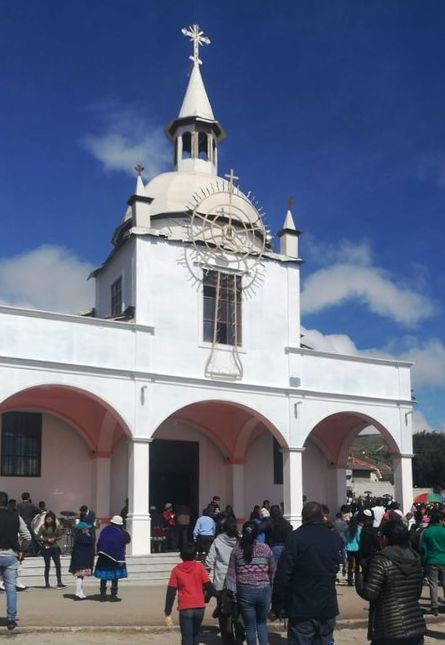
- Santuario Eucarístico Nacional de Cañar
- 2.566871°S 78.941284°W
- Location: Cañar, Ecuador
- Denomination: Roman Catholic

History
- Status: Parish church

Architecture
- Architectural type: Church

Administration
- Diocese: Roman Catholic Diocese of Azogues

The Santuario Eucarístico Nacional de Cañar, previously Santuario Católico Eucarístico Diocesano San Antonio is a Catholic church, located west of the city of Cañar, in the Province of Cañar, Ecuador.

== History ==
The history of the Sanctuary dates back to the Eucharistic miracle that occurred on June 24, 1958, when after the onslaught of the bubonic plague in the canton, in 1934, the year that marked the construction of the chapel, it was presented during a mass in which the faithful claimed to have witnessed the appearance of the face of Jesus in the holy monstrance, when they began to notice a strange event on the sacred form exposed in the monstrance a black spot appeared, then the image of the Lord in the Host was clearly distinguished; the same vision was experienced by several people who were in the small chapel, one of them went out to the square and shouted "miracle! miracle!" He communicated to the faithful and curious people who were in that place.

And the whole group of people also contemplated the vision, some without warning and others warned by their companions.

This fact gave rise to a unique event that marked not only the canton, but the entire nation, which called the attention of the national clergy to the miracle, which the parents of that time received the visit of the then first archbishop of Cuenca, Monsignor Manuel de Jesús Serrano Abad to verify the fact, which was recognized by the Holy See, at that time already being recognized by Pope John XXIII.

=== Elevation of the chapel to Sanctuary ===
After this change of category, it will also be detailed that the parish priest and his successors will be named directors of the sanctuary, who will be in charge of the financial administration together with the pastoral council, having to present each year to the curia, that is, to the Diocese of Azogues, the respective details of the accounting managed by the priests.

== Features and style ==
This sanctuary is of vernacular, typical of the place, with which, with technological advances, it is intended to rescue the most intimate part of the temple so that the most traditional part that the temple represents for the locals and for tourists from the province, the country and the world is rescued.

=== Location ===
It is located 5 minutes from the street that connects to the Pan-American highway, and 40 minutes from the city of Azogues.
