= Carlos Anibal Altamirano Argüello =

Ecuadorian Catholic bishop

The Most Reverend Carlos Anibal Altamirano
- Bishop of Azogues
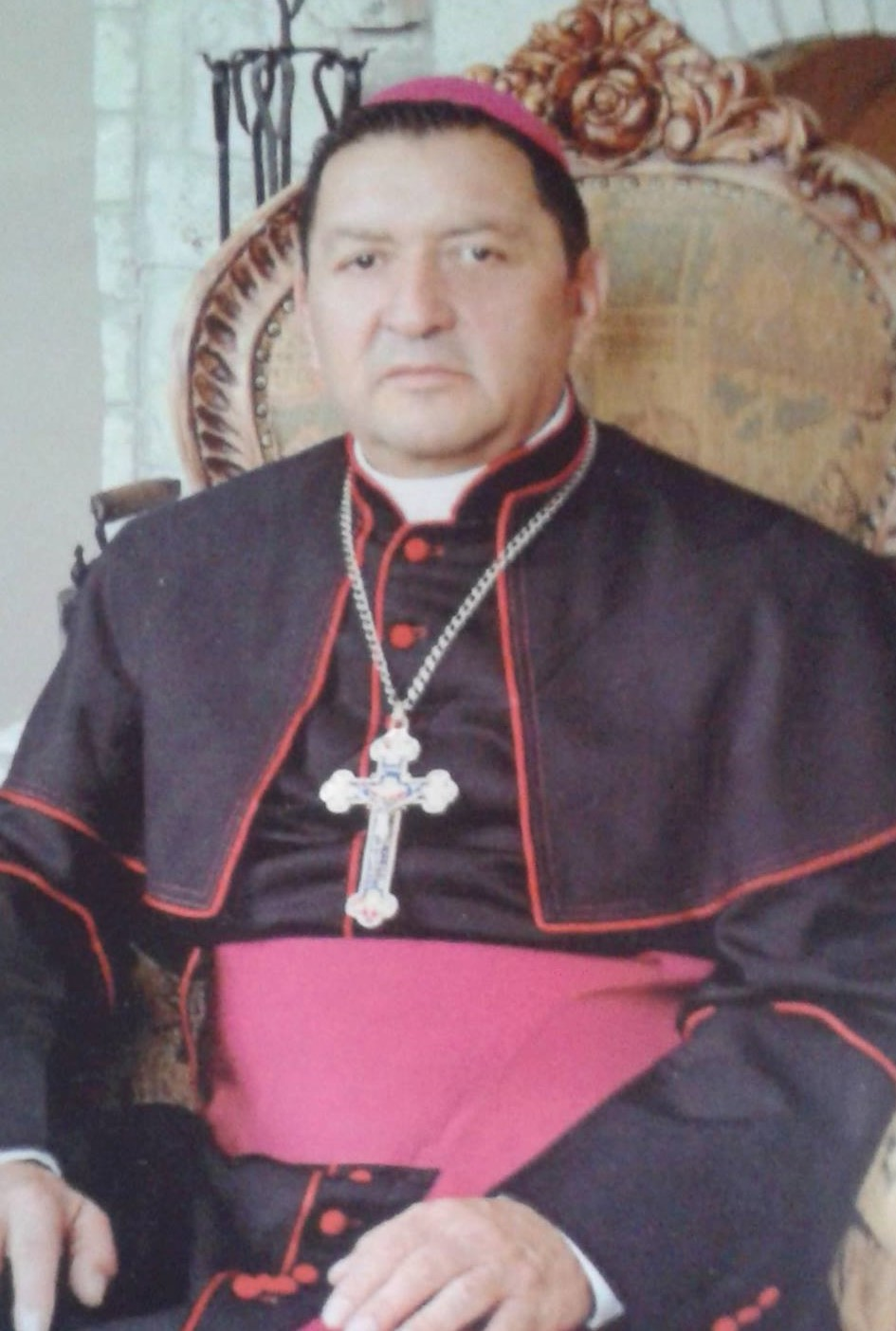
- Church: Roman Catholic Church
- Appointed: February 14, 2004
- Predecessor: Clímaco Jacinto Zarauz Carrillo
- Successor: Oswaldo Patricio Vintimilla Cabrera

Orders
- Ordination: June 29, 1966
- Consecration: by Pope John Paul II

Personal details
- Born: Carlos Anibal Altamirano Argüello; 13 March 1942; Aloasí, Ecuador
- Died: September 25, 2015 (aged 73)
- Motto: Haced lo que el os diga

Carlos Anibal Altamirano Argüello (13 March 1942 – 25 September 2015) was an Ecuadorian Catholic bishop, who served as IV Bishop of Azogues, from 2004 until his death on September 25, 2015.

== Biography ==
=== Early years and academic formation ===
Carlos Aníbal was born on March 13, 1942, in the Aloasí parish, Cantón Mejía, in the Province of Pichincha, Ecuador.

He studied Philosophy and Theology at the Major Seminary of Quito.

In 1981, he traveled to Rome to complete his religious formation at the Pontifical Gregorian University, where he obtained a Bachelor of Theology, with a specialization in Missiology.

=== Priesthood ===
He was ordained a priest on June 29, 1966.

He exercised his pastoral ministry as parish priest in Pintaj and Calderón, of the Roman Catholic Archdiocese of Quito.

Upon returning to his country after his studies, he was appointed parish priest of Cotocollao.

=== Episcopate ===
==== Auxiliary Bishop of Quito ====
On January 3, 1994, Pope John Paul II named him 3rd Titular Bishop of Ambia and Auxiliary Bishop of Quito.

He was consecrated on February 20 of the same year, at the hands of the then Archbishop of Quito, Antonio González Zumárraga. His co-consecrators were the then Auxiliary Bishops of Quito, Antonio Arregui Yarza and Enrique Orellana Ricaurte.

In the Ecuadorian Episcopal Conference he collaborated in the Pastoral of Missions, Sanctuaries, Indigenous Pastoral and Workers.

He was a member of the Liturgy Commission.

==== Bishop of Azogues ====
On February 14, 2004, Pope John Paul II appointed him 4th Bishop of Azogues.

For 11 years that he served as Bishop of the city of Azogues, he carried out spiritual and material work, the most important being the construction of the San Carlos Borromeo Major Seminary, in the Javier Loyola parish of the city of Azogues.

== Death ==
He died in the city of Quito, Ecuador on September 25, 2015, after he suffered multiple complications derived from the diabetes he suffered from.
