= Our Lady of Mercy Church =

Our Lady of Mercy Church may refer to:

- Our Lady of Mercy Church (Buenos Aires), Argentina
- Our Lady of Mercy's Church (Bronx), New York
- Our Lady of Mercy Church (Port Chester, New York)
- Our Lady of Mercy of Ullal, Karnataka, India
- Church of Our Lady of Mercy (João Pessoa), Paraíba, Brazil
- Church of Our Lady of Mercy (Novo Hamburgo), Rio Grande do Sul, Brazil

== See also ==
- Our Lady of Mercy Chapel, Hanover Township, New Jersey
- Our Lady of Mercy's Chapel (Clove Valley, New York)
- Our Lady of Mercy Cathedral (disambiguation)
