= Diocese of Babahoyo =

Roman Catholic diocese in Ecuador

Coordinates: 1°48′0″S 79°32′24″W

Diocese of Babahoyo Dioecesis Babahoiensis

Catholic
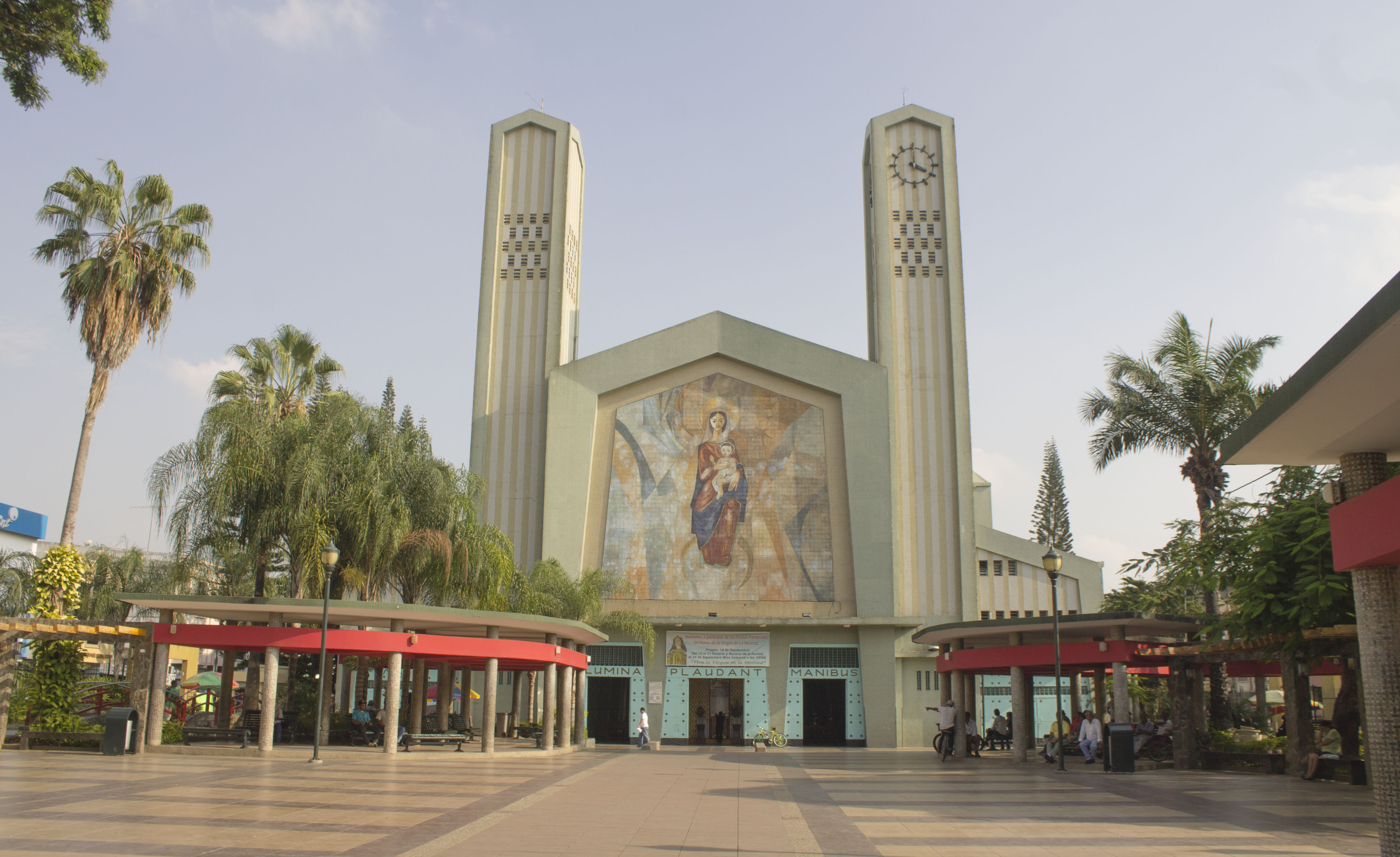
- Cathedral of Nuestra Señora de la Merced (Our Lady of Mercy)

Location
- Country: Ecuador
- Ecclesiastical province: Guayaquil

Statistics
- Area: 6,531 km^{2} (2,522 sq mi)
- Population: Total; Catholics: (as of 2006); 751,000; 555,000 (73.9%)
- Parishes: 21

Information
- Denomination: Roman Catholic
- Rite: Latin Rite
- Established: 15 July 1948 (Established as Apostolic Vicariate of Los Ríos); 10 September 1951 (Promoted as Territorial Prelature); 22 August 1994 (Promoted as Diocese of Babahoyo)
- Cathedral: Our Lady of Mercy Cathedral, Babahoyo

Current leadership
- Pope: Leo XIV
- Bishop: Skiper Bladimir Yáñez Calvachi

Map
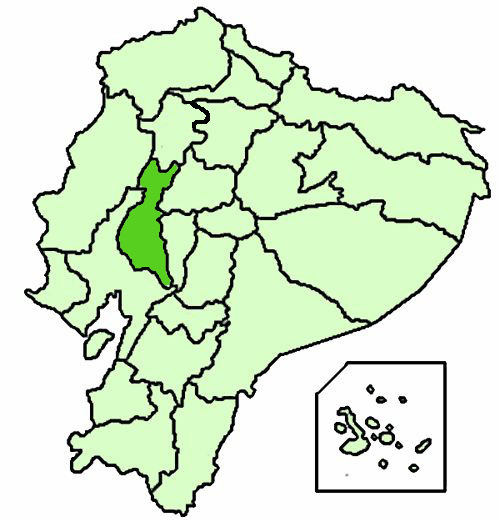

The Roman Catholic Diocese of Babahoyo (Latin: Dioecesis Babahoiensis) is a diocese located in the city of Babahoyo in the ecclesiastical province of Guayaquil in Ecuador.

== History ==
In 1947, the area was set up as the Apostolic Vicariate of Los Ríos or Fluminum (in Latin), from the then-Diocese of Guayaquil. An apostolic vicariate is normally a temporary situation, and exempt under canon law, directly subject to the missionary Dicastery for Evangelization of the Vatican in Rome; the territory comes directly under the pope as "universal bishop", and the pope exercises this authority through a "vicar". The Apostolic vicariate in this period (1947-1951) was headed by an administrator, Fr. Adolfo Maria Astudillo Morales, who never was ordained a bishop.

In 1951, it was promoted to a Territorial Prelature, subject to the Diocese of Quito, and still with an administrator who was a priest, Astudillo Morales.

In 1956, the Territorial Prelature became suffragan to the Diocese of Guayaquil.

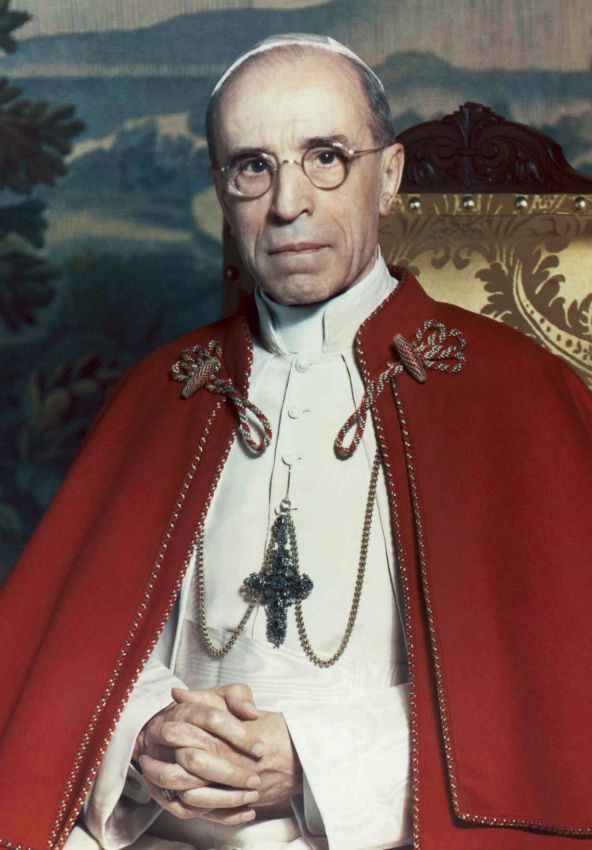
Pope Pius XII, c. 1951

Pope Pius XII (reigned 1939-1958) was instrumental in the development of the Diocese, as he created both the Apostolic Vicariate and the Territorial Prelature, and then transferred the latter to Guayaquil. In addition, he approved of the veneration of Our Lady of Quito, Queen of Ecuador as a patron of Catholic education in Ecuador. Finally, Pius XII also promoted the local bishop (of Guayaquil and later Archbishop of Quito), Carlos María de la Torre, to be a Cardinal in 1953, becoming the first cardinal from Ecuador.

On 22 August 1994, it was promoted to the Diocese of Babahoyo, by Pope John Paul II.

== Ordinaries ==
The ordinaries, or supervisors of the Diocese of Babahoyo have been as follows:

Apostolic Administrator

- Adolfo Maria Astudillo Morales (13 Aug 1948 – 1957), never consecrated bishop
- Victor Garaygordóbil Berrizbeitia (1957 – 29 Nov 1963); see below

Prelate of Los Rios

- Victor Garaygordóbil Berrizbeitia (29 Nov 1963 – 12 May 1982); consecrated bishop at this time; see above
- Jesús Ramón Martínez de Ezquerecocha Suso (28 Jun 1984 – 22 Aug 1994); see below

Bishops of Babahoyo

- Jesús Ramón Martínez de Ezquerecocha Suso (22 Aug 1994 – 27 Mar 2008); see above
- Fausto Trávez Trávez, O.F.M. (27 Mar 2008 – 11 September 2010), appointed Archbishop of Quito
- Marco Pérez Caicedo (10 February 2012 - 20 June 2016), appointed Archbishop of Cuenca
- Skiper Bladimir Yáñez Calvachi (27 Mar 2018 - )

== See also ==
- Roman Catholicism in Ecuador
