= Diocese of Azogues =

Roman Catholic diocese in Ecuador

Coordinates: 2°44′S 78°50′W

Diocese of Azogues Dioecesis Azoguensis

Catholic
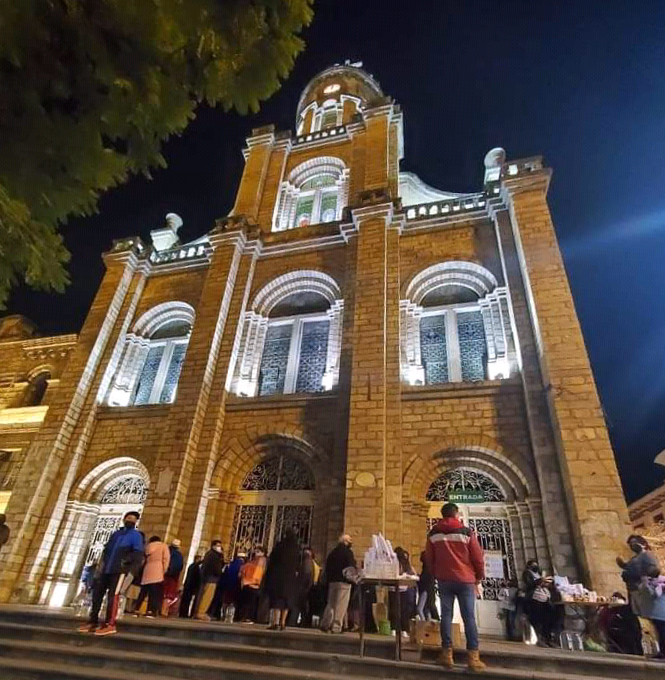
- Cathedral of Azogues

Location
- Country: Ecuador
- Ecclesiastical province: Cuenca
- Metropolitan: Vicente Rodrigo Cisneros Durán

Statistics
- Area: 4,515 km^{2} (1,743 sq mi)
- Population: Total; Catholics: (as of 2006); 210,000; 208,000 (99%)
- Parishes: 33

Information
- Denomination: Roman Catholic
- Rite: Latin Rite
- Established: 26 June 1958 (68 years ago), created by the pope Paul VI.

Current leadership
- Pope: Leo XIV
- Bishop: Oswaldo Patricio Vintimilla Cabrera

Map
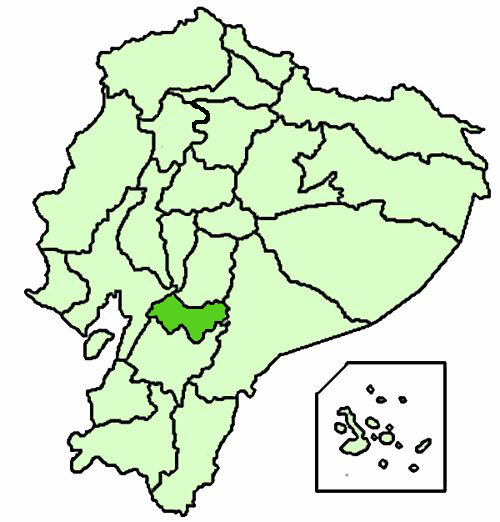

The Roman Catholic Diocese of Azogues (Latin: Dioecesis Azoguensis) is a diocese located in the city of Azogues in the ecclesiastical province of Cuenca in Ecuador. It was created on 26 June 1968 from territory of the Archdiocese of Cuenca by the papal bull made by Pope Paul VI.

== Ordinaries ==
- José Gabriel Diaz Cueva (26 Jun 1968 – 29 Apr 1975)
- Raúl Eduardo Vela Chiriboga (29 Apr 1975 – 8 Jul 1989), appointed Bishop of Ecuador, Military; future Cardinal
- Clímaco Jacinto Zarauz Carrillo (2 Mar 1990 – 14 Feb 2004)
- Carlos Anibal Altamirano Argüello (14 Feb 2004 – 25 Sept 2015)
- Oswaldo Patricio Vintimilla Cabrera (25 June 2016 – present)
