= Victor Garaigordóbil Berrizbeitia =

Spanish bishop (1915–2018)

The Most Reverend Victor Garaigordóbil Berrizbeitia
- Prelate of Diocese of Babahoyo (Emeritus)
- Church: Catholic Church
- See: Diocese of Babahoyo
- In office: 1963–1982
- Predecessor: Adolfo Maria Astudillo Morales
- Successor: Jesús Ramón Martínez de Ezquerecocha Suso
- Previous post: Priest

Orders
- Ordination: 27 June 1943

Personal details
- Born: 17 October 1915 Abadiano, Spain
- Died: 24 April 2018 (aged 102) Bilbao, Spain

Victor Garaigordobil Berrizbeitia (17 October 1915 – 24 April 2018) was a Spanish bishop of the Catholic Church. At the time of his death, at the age of 102, he was the oldest bishop of Spain.

== Life ==
Garaigordóbil was born in Abadiano, Biscay (Basque Country).

Ordained a priest on 27 June 1943.

He was appointed Prelate of the Diocese of Babahoyo and titular bishop of Pudentiana on 29 November 1963.

He was consecrated bishop of the Titular see of Pudentiana on 30 January 1964.

He resigned as titular bishop of Pudentiana on 5 January 1978 and from the Prelate of the Diocese of Babahoyo on 12 May 1982.
