= José Gabriel Diaz Cueva =

Ecuadorian Roman Catholic bishop (1925–2018)

The Most Reverend José Gabriel Díaz Cueva
- Bishop of Azogues
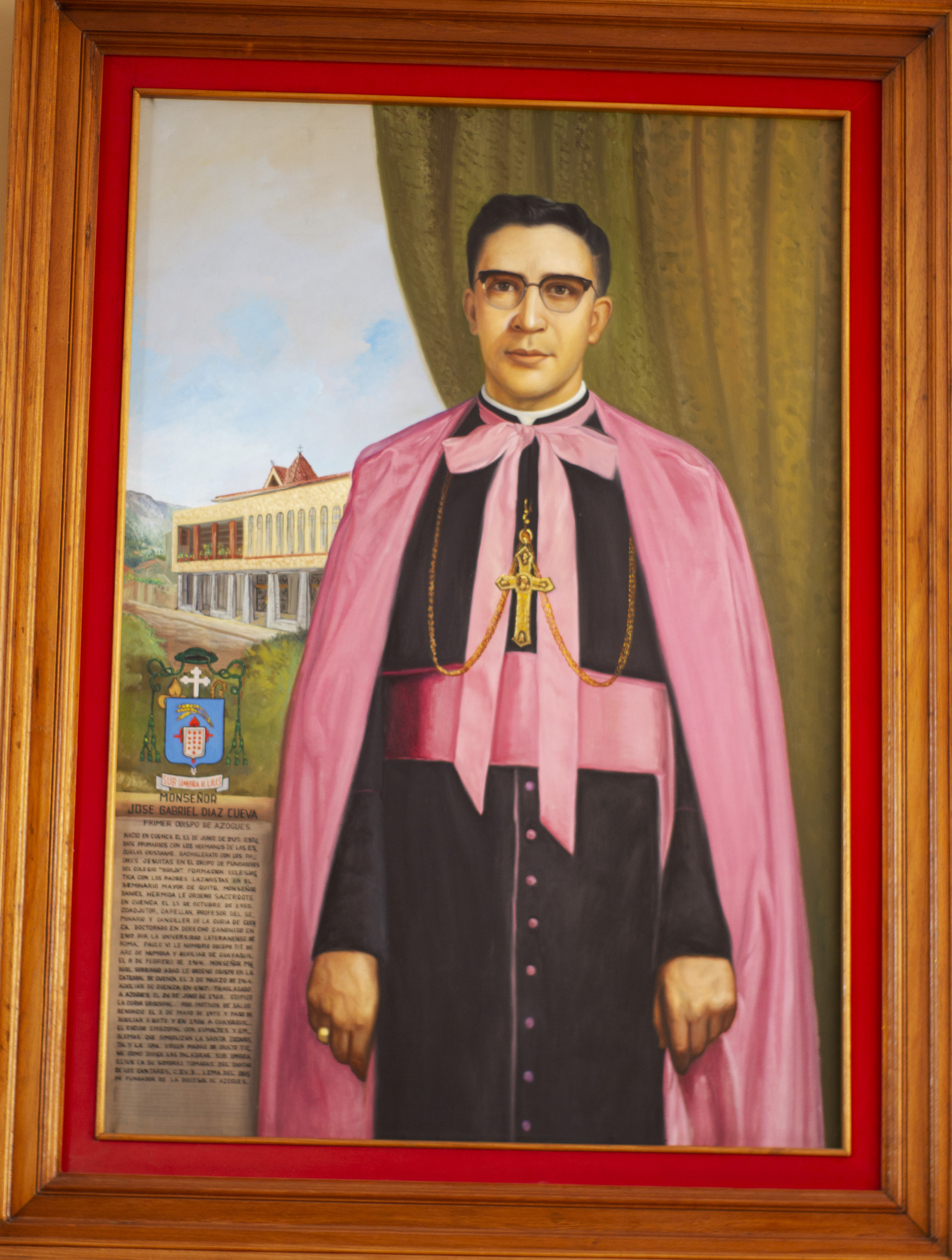
- Gabriel Díaz Cueva, first bishop of Azogues.
- Church: Roman Catholic Church
- Appointed: March 3, 1964
- Predecessor: Erection of the Diocese
- Successor: Raúl Vela Chiriboga

Orders
- Ordination: October 15, 1950
- Consecration: by Pope Paul VI; Manuel de Jesús Serrano Abad

Personal details
- Born: José Gabriel Díaz Cueva; 13 June 1925 Cuenca, Ecuador
- Died: January 26, 2018 (aged 92)

José Gabriel Díaz Cueva (13 June 1925 – 26 January 2018) was an Ecuadorian Catholic bishop, who served as the inaugural Bishop of Azogues from 1968 until his resignation in 1975.

== Biography ==
He was born in the capital of the Province of Azuay, Cuenca.

=== Priestly ordination ===
He was ordained priest on October 15, 1950.

=== Episcopate ===
==== Episcopal ordination ====
He was consecrated as Auxiliary Bishop of the Archdiocese of Cuenca on March 3, 1964, by Monsignor Manuel de Jesús Serrano Abad.

==== 1st Bishop of Azogues ====
He was appointed the 1st Bishop of Azogues of the newly created Diocese of Azogues on June 26, 1968, by the Holy Pope Paul VI.

==== Positions held ====
- Auxiliary Bishop of the Archdiocese of Guayaquil
- Auxiliary Bishop of the Archdiocese of Cuenca
- Auxiliary Bishop of the Archdiocese of Quito
- Bishop of the Diocese of Azogues

== Death ==
Díaz Cueva died on January 26, 2018, in a retirement home in the City of Cuenca at the age of 92, a product of his advanced age.
