= Alfredo José Espinoza Mateus =

Ecuadorian prelate (born 1958)

The Most Reverend Alfredo José Espinoza Mateus S.D.B.
- Archbishop of Quito
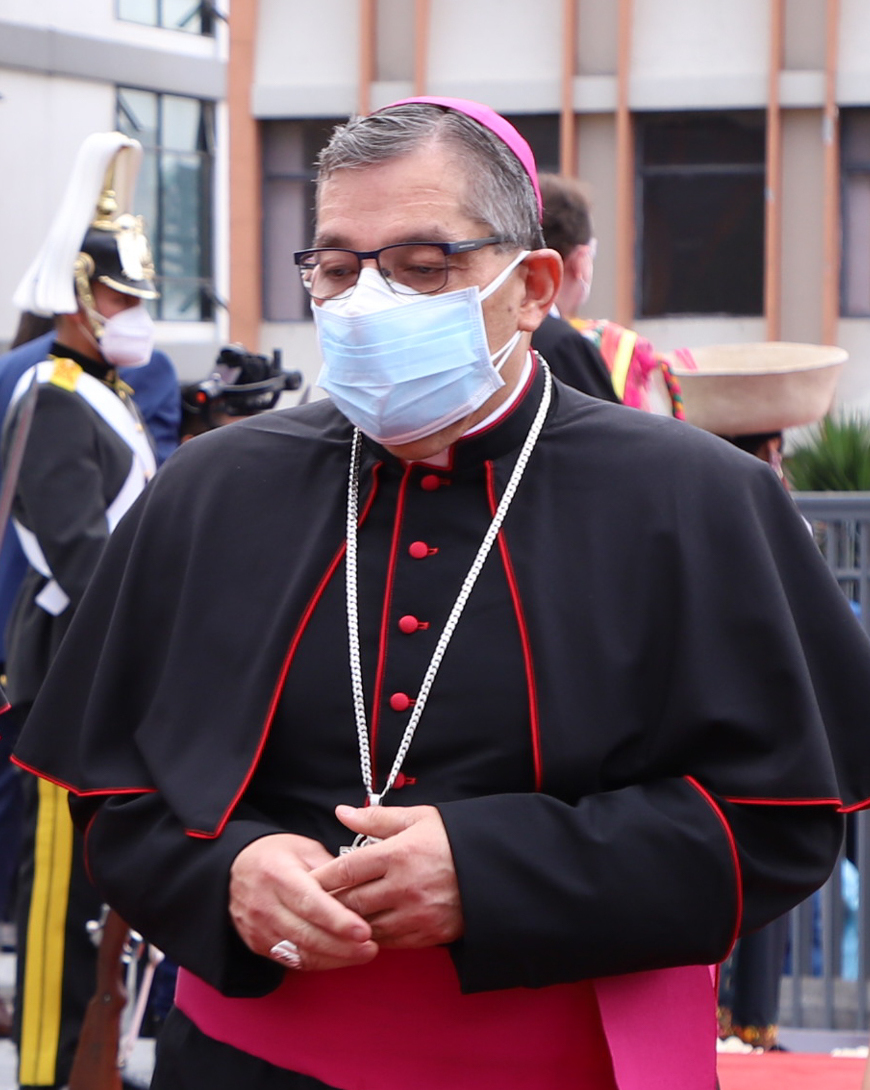
- Church: Roman Catholic Church
- Archdiocese: Quito
- See: Quito
- Appointed: 5 April 2019
- Installed: 2 May 2019
- Predecessor: Fausto Gabriel Trávez Trávez
- Previous post: Bishop of Loja (2014-19)

Orders
- Ordination: 17 December 1988 by Teodoro Luis Arroyo Robelly
- Consecration: 18 January 2014 by Giacomo Guido Ottonello

Personal details
- Born: Alfredo José Espinoza Mateus; 22 April 1958 (age 68) Guayaquil, Ecuador
- Education: Pontifical University of Ecuador
- Motto: Faciam vos piscatores hominum
- Coat of arms

Alfredo José Espinoza Mateus S.D.B. (born 22 April 1958) is an Ecuadorian prelate of the Catholic Church who was named Archbishop of Quito on 5 April 2019.

== Biography ==
Alfredo José Espinoza Mateus was born on 22 April 1958 in Guayaquil, Ecuador. He took his first vows as a Salesian on 24 January 1979 and his final vows on 16 August 1984. He was ordained a priest on 17 December 1988. He earned a licentiate in education sciences from the Pontifical University of Ecuador.

Between 1983 and 2013, Espinoza held a series of positions in Salesian educational institutions as administrator, vice-rector and rector, and within the Salesian order, including financial director of the Salesians of Ecuador from 2009 to 2013. He was a member of the board of directors and the economic council of the Politecnica Salesiana University and, from 2011 to 2013, head of the order's oversight board and a member of its committee for vocations.

Pope Francis named him Bishop of Loja on 20 December 2013, and he received his episcopal consecration from Archbishop Giacomo Guido Ottonello on 18 January 2014.

Pope Francis appointed him Archbishop of Quito of 5 April 2019. He was installed there on 2 May.

Catholic Church titles
Preceded by Julio Parrilla Díaz	Bishop of Loja; 2013-2019	Vacant
Preceded by Fausto Trávez Trávez	Archbishop of Quito; 2019-present	Incumbent
