= Raúl Eduardo Vela Chiriboga =

Ecuadorian archbishop and cardinal (1934–2020)

His Eminence Raúl Eduardo Vela Chiriboga
- Cardinal, Archbishop of Quito
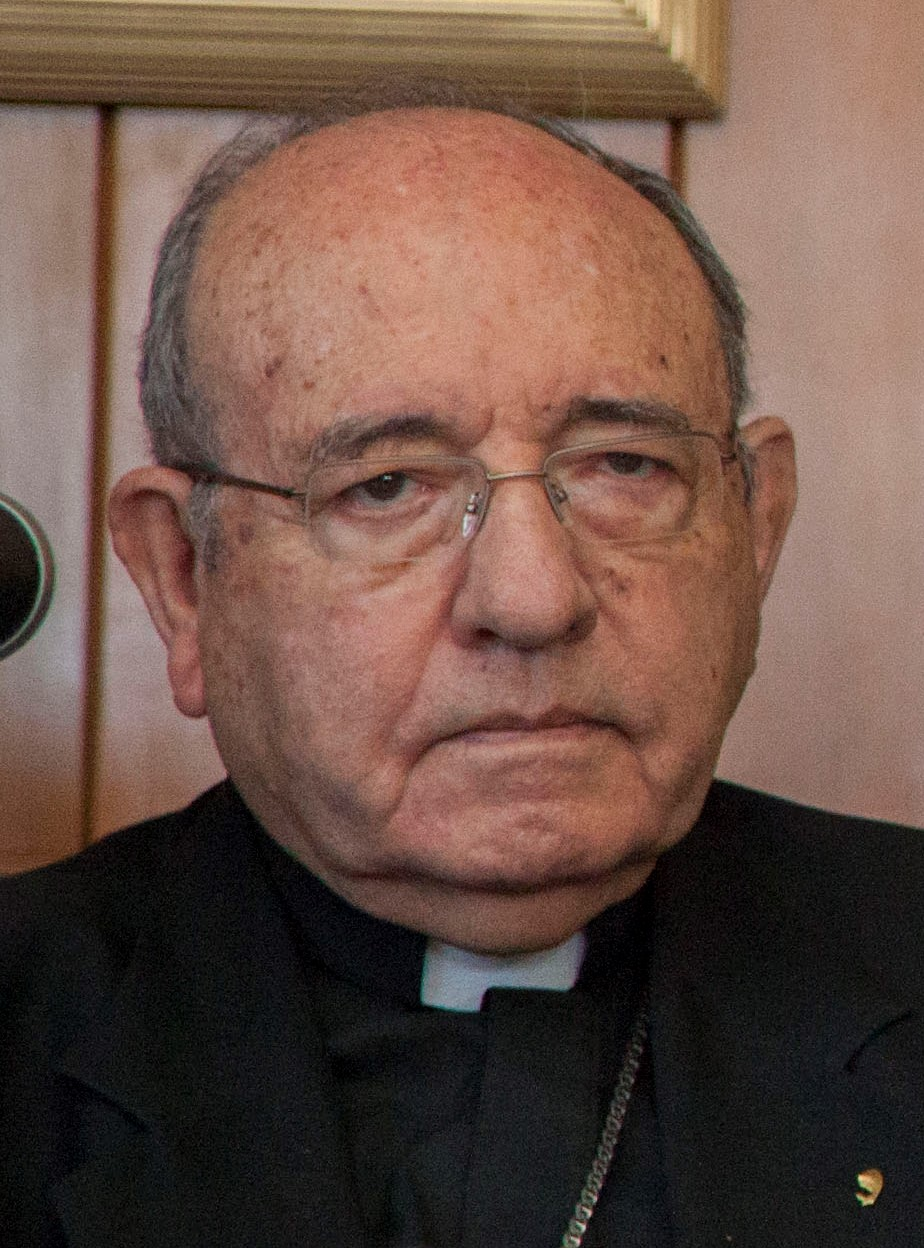
- Raúl Eduardo Vela Chiriboga in 2014
- Province: Quito
- Diocese: Archdiocese of Quito
- See: Cathedral of Quito
- Installed: 21 March 2003
- Term ended: 11 September 2010
- Predecessor: Antonio José González Zumárraga
- Successor: Fausto Trávez Trávez
- Other post: Cardinal-Priest of Santa Maria in Via
- Previous posts: Auxiliary Bishop of Guayaquil (1972–1975); Titular Bishop of Ausafa (1972–1975); Bishop of Azogues (1975–1989); Bishop of the Military Ordinariate of Ecuador (1989–2003); Titular Bishop of Pauzera (1989–1998)

Orders
- Ordination: 28 July 1957 by Leonidas Eduardo Proaño Villalba
- Consecration: 21 May 1972 by Pablo Muñoz Vega
- Created cardinal: 20 November 2010 by Benedict XVI
- Rank: Cardinal-Priest

Personal details
- Born: 1 January 1934 Riobamba, Ecuador
- Died: 15 November 2020 (aged 86) Quito, Ecuador
- Denomination: Roman Catholic
- Motto: "Cum Maria Marte Jesu" (with Mary, mother of Jesus)
- Coat of arms

Raúl Eduardo Vela Chiriboga (1 January 1934 – 15 November 2020) was an Ecuadorian prelate of the Catholic Church who was the Archbishop of Quito from 2003 to 2010. He became a bishop coadjutor in 1972 and served as an auxiliary in Guayaquil, Bishop of Azogues, and Military Ordinary of Ecuador before his appointment in Quito. Pope Benedict XVI raised him to the rank of cardinal in 2010.

== Biography ==
Raúl Eduardo Vela Chiriboga was born on 1 January 1934 in Riobamba, Ecuador. He was one of nine children. He attended a Salesian high school there. In 1951 he entered the major seminary in Quito and studied theology and philosophy in the local seminary. On 28 July 1957, he was ordained a priest of the Diocese of Riobamba. He was the director of Caritas for that diocese. From 1968 to 1970 he served as undersecretary of the Ecuadorian Episcopal Conference and was then elected its secretary general.

On 20 April 1972 Pope Paul VI appointed him titular Bishop of Ausafa and Auxiliary Bishop of Guayaquil. He received his episcopal consecration on 21 May 1972. During this time he worked with the Christian Family Movement.

On 29 April 1975 Pope Paul named him Bishop of Azogues. In February 1979, he participated as a delegate of Ecuador's bishops in the third General Conference of Latin American Bishops and from 1981 to 1988 he was a member of the Latin American Episcopal Council (CELAM).

On 8 July 1989, Pope John Paul II transferred him to the titular see of Pauzera and appointed Military Ordinary of Ecuador.

On 21 March 2003, Pope John Paul appointed him Archbishop of Quito, where he worked above all for education and priestly formation.

Pope Benedict XVI accepted his resignation as Archbishop of Quito on 11 September 2010.

Pope Benedict elevated Vela Chiriboga to the status of cardinal at a consistory on 20 November 2010, making him Cardinal-Priest of Santa Maria in Via. He participated in the papal conclave of 2013 which elected Pope Francis.

He died on 15 November 2020 in Quito.

Preceded by José Gabriel Diaz Cueva	Bishop of Azogues; 1975–1989	Succeeded by Clímaco Jacinto Zarauz Carrillo
