= Jungitu =

Hamlet in Álava

- Concejo
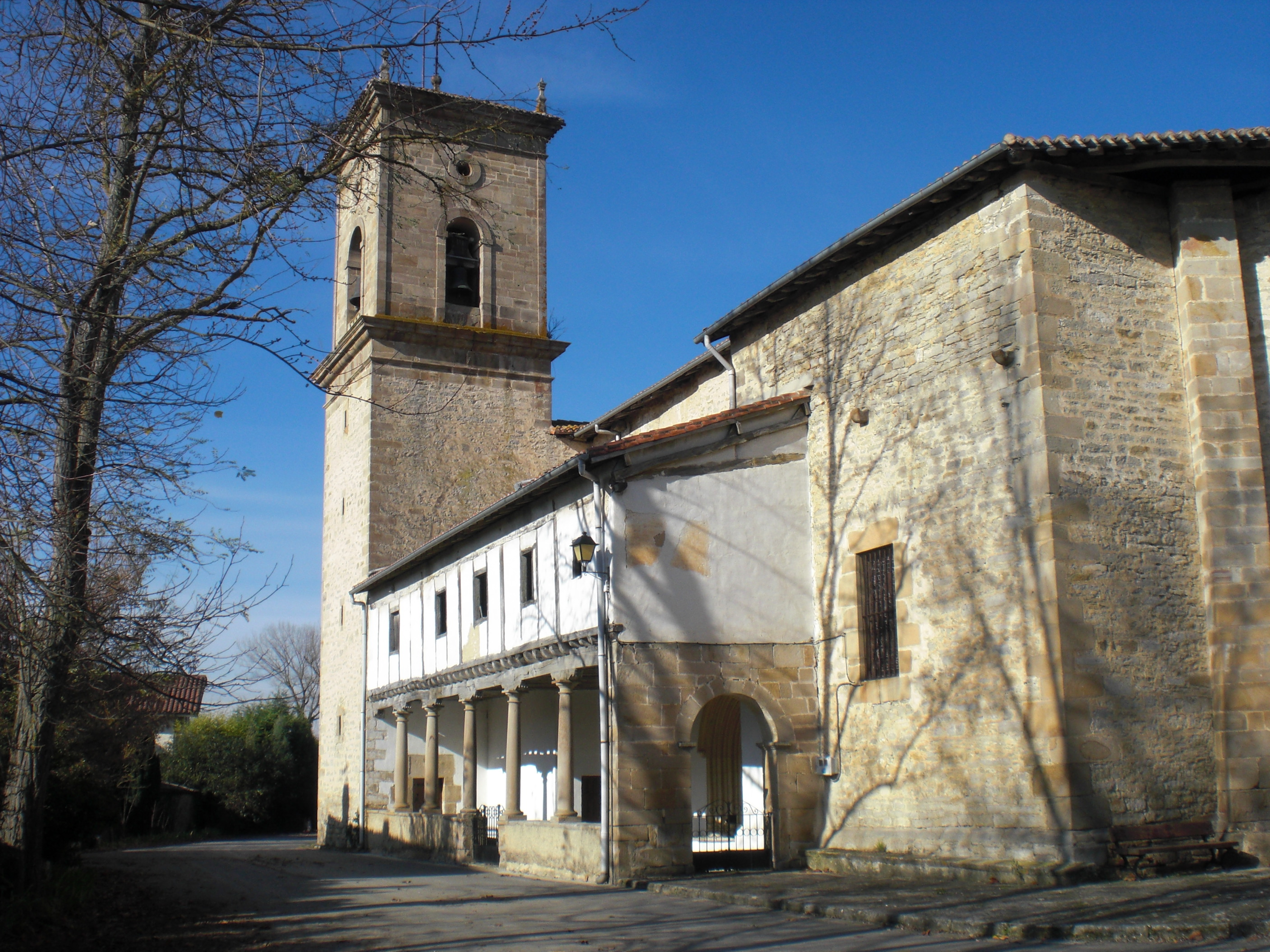
- Church of San Millán

- Coat of arms

- Location within Álava Location within the Basque Country Location within Spain
- Coordinates: 42°52′22″N 2°35′41″W
- Country: Spain
- Autonomous community: Basque Country
- Province: Álava
- Comarca: Vitoria-Gasteiz
- Municipality: Vitoria-Gasteiz

Area
  - Total: 2.85 km^{2} (1.10 sq mi)
- Elevation: 519 m (1,703 ft)

Population (2022)
  - Total: 111
  - Density: 38.9/km^{2} (101/sq mi)
- Postal code: 01192

Jungitu (Spanish: Junguitu) is a hamlet and concejo located in the municipality of Vitoria-Gasteiz, in Álava province, Basque Country, Spain.
