= Vicente Rodrigo Cisneros Durán =

Ecuadorian Roman Catholic archbishop

- Archbishop of Cuenca
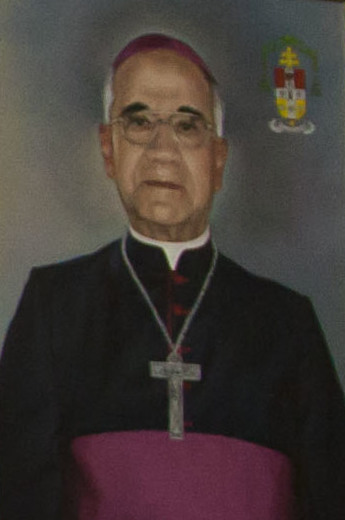
- Church: Catholic Church
- Archdiocese: Archdiocese of Cuenca
- In office: 15 February 2000 – 20 April 2009
- Predecessor: Luis Alberto Luna Tobar
- Successor: Luis Cabrera Herrera
- Previous posts: Bishop of Ambato (1969-2000); Titular Bishop of Tigisis in Mauretania (1967-1969); Auxiliary Bishop of Guayaquil (1967-1969)

Orders
- Ordination: 17 July 1957
- Consecration: 7 January 1968 by Bernardino Echeverría Ruiz

Personal details
- Born: 23 February 1934 Pelileo, Tungurahua Province, Ecuador
- Died: 29 December 2017 (aged 83) Quito, Ecuador

Vicente Rodrigo Cisneros Durán (23 February 1934 – 29 December 2017) was an Ecuadorian Roman Catholic archbishop.

Cisneros Durán was ordained to the priesthood in 1957. He subsequently served as an auxiliary bishop of the Roman Catholic Archdiocese of Guayaquil from 1967 to 1969, diocesan bishop of the Roman Catholic Diocese of Ambato from 1969 to 2000 and archbishop of the Roman Catholic Archdiocese of Cuenca from 2000 to 2009. He died on 29 December 2017, aged 83.
