= Riobamba Cathedral =

St. Peter Cathedral
- Catedral de San Pedro
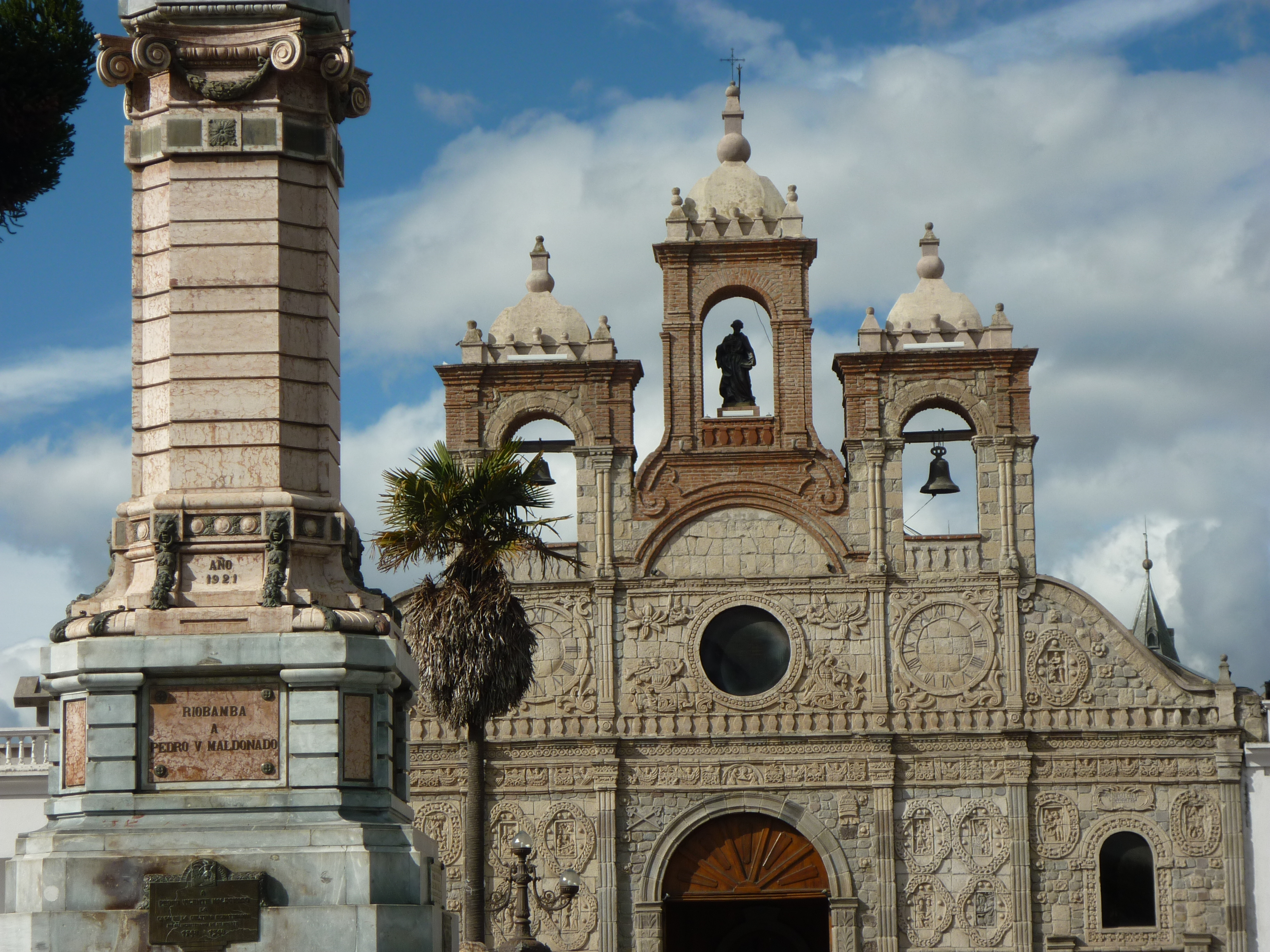
- Location: Riobamba
- Country: Ecuador
- Denomination: Roman Catholic Church

The Cathedral of Saint Peter (Spanish: Catedral de San Pedro) or simply Riobamba Cathedral is the cathedral church of the Roman Catholic Diocese of Riobamba, situated on the Parque Maldonado in Riobamba, Chimborazo, Ecuador.

The current structure, mixing Spanish and indigenous elements, is well-regarded as an example of Plateresque art. It was reconstructed from 1810 to 1835 from the remains of the Andean Baroque structure which was destroyed in the earthquake of 1797.

It is the mother church of the Diocese of Riobamba (Dioecesis Rivibambensis), which was created as Diocese of Bolivar in 1862 in the pontificate of Pope Pius IX and assumed its current name in 1955.

== See also ==
- Catholic Church in Ecuador

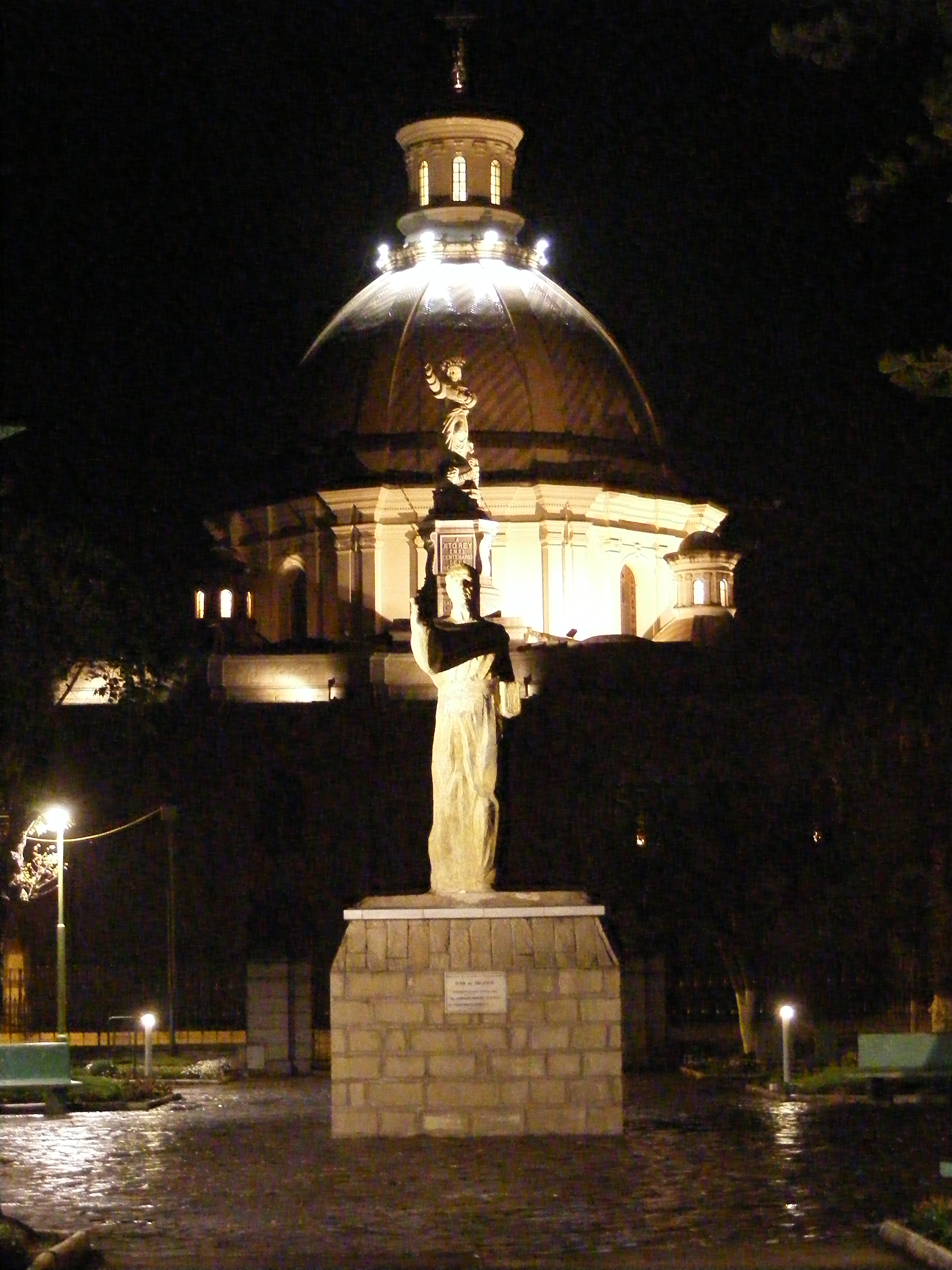
Another view
