= Our Lady of Mercy Cathedral, Babahoyo =

Our Lady of Mercy Cathedral
- Catedral Nuestra Señora de la Merced
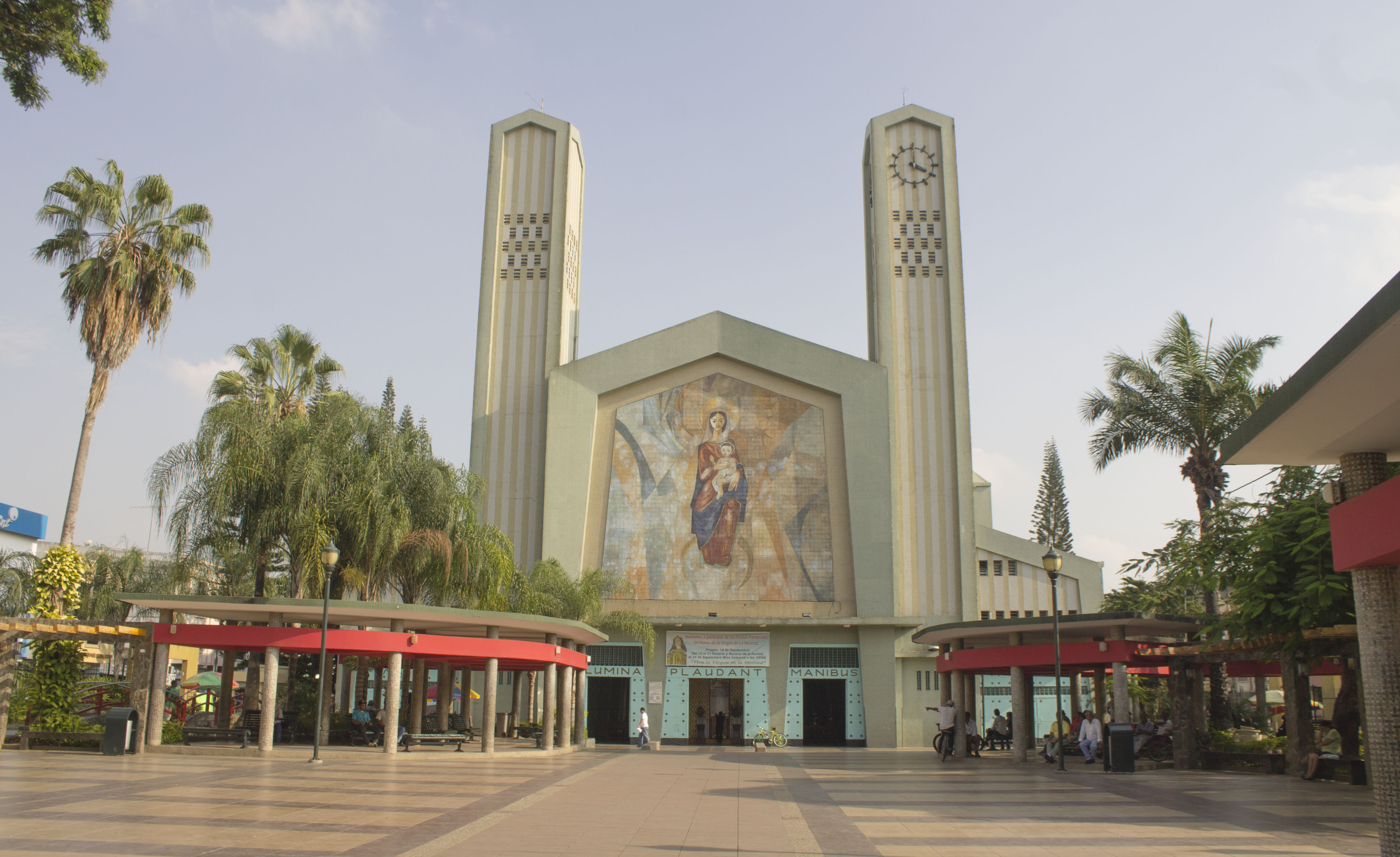
- Our Lady of Mercy Cathedral
- Location: Babahoyo
- Country: Ecuador
- Denomination: Roman Catholic Church

The Our Lady of Mercy Cathedral (Spanish: Catedral Nuestra Señora de la Merced) also called Babahoyo Cathedral It is a religious building is located opposite the 24 de Mayo park, in the city of Babahoyo capital of Canton Babahoyo in the province of Los Rios, in the heart of the South American country of Ecuador.

The cathedral follows the Roman or Latin rite and serves as headquarters of the Diocese of Babahoyo in the ecclesial province of Guayaquil (Dioecesis Babahoiensis). Diocese was created in 1994 by bull Constat praelaturam of Pope John Paul II, based on the previous territorial prelature created in created in 1951 by Pope Pius XII.

It was dedicated to the Virgin Mary in her title of Our Lady of Mercy. It is under the pastoral responsibility of the Bishop Marcos Aurelio Pérez Caicedo. The current building began to be built and was consecrated and opened in 1963. Additionally, in 1969 there was the blessing of the mural dedicated to the Our Lady of Mercy (Virgen de las Mercedes).

== See also ==
- List of cathedrals in Ecuador
- Our Lady of Mercy Cathedral
- Roman Catholicism in Ecuador
