= Fausto Trávez Trávez =

Ecuadorian prelate

His Excellency Fausto Trávez Trávez, O.F.M.
- Archbishop emeritus of Quito
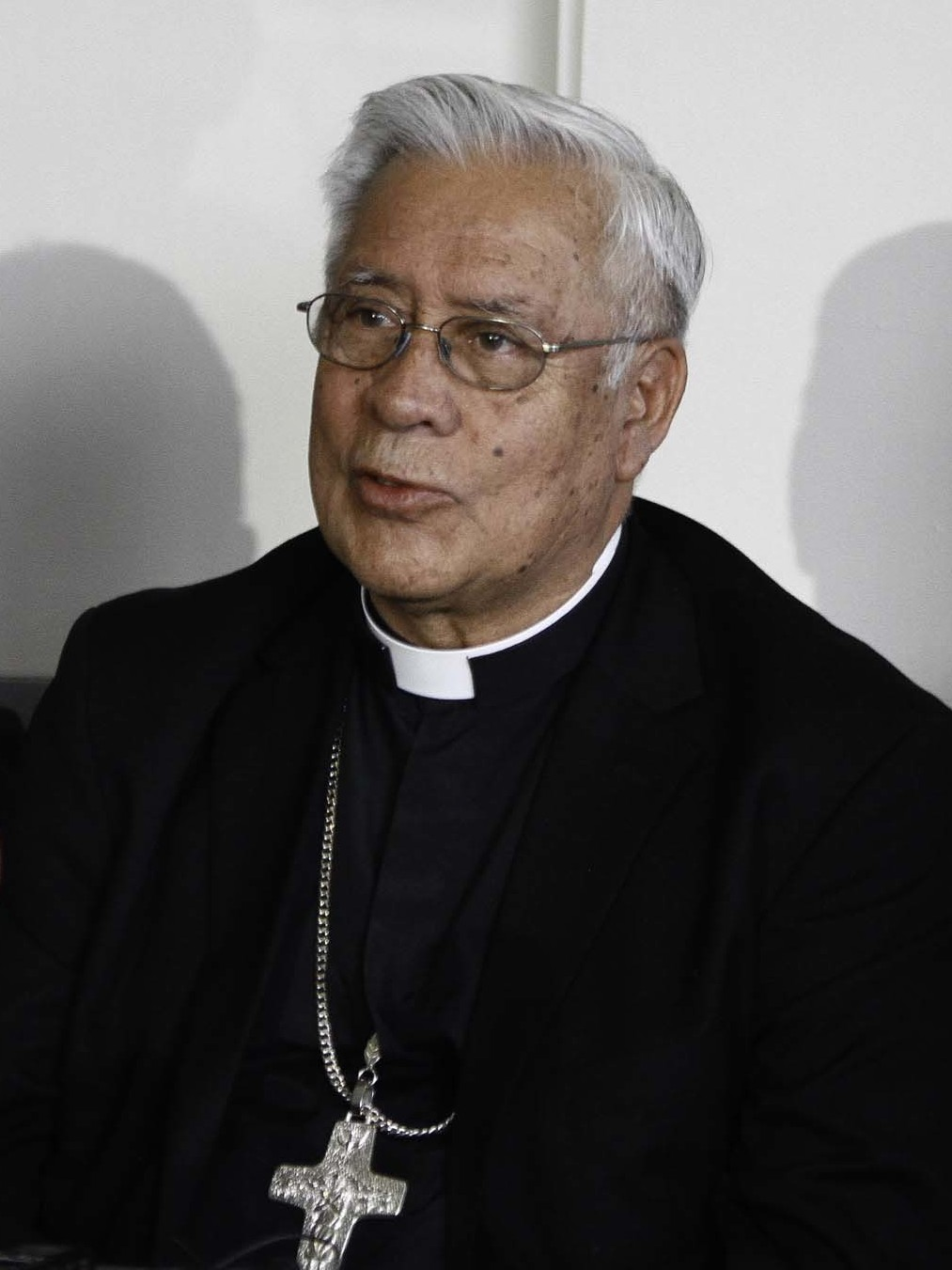
- Province: Quito
- Diocese: Archdiocese of Quito
- See: Cathedral of Quito
- Installed: 11 September 2010
- Term ended: 5 April 2019
- Predecessor: Raúl Eduardo Vela Chiriboga
- Successor: Alfredo José Espinoza Mateus
- Other post: Primate of Ecuador

Orders
- Ordination: 12 December 1970
- Consecration: 15 March 2003

Personal details
- Born: Fausto Gabriel Trávez Trávez; 18 March 1941 (age 85) Toacazo, Cotopaxi, Ecuador
- Denomination: Roman Catholic
- Coat of arms

Styles of Fausto Gabriel Trávez Trávez
- Reference style: The Most Reverend
- Spoken style: Your Excellency
- Religious style: Archbishop
- Posthumous style: not applicable

Fausto Gabriel Trávez Trávez, O.F.M. (born 18 March 1941) is an Ecuadorian prelate of the Catholic Church who was Archbishop of Quito from 2010 to 2019. He previously served as Bishop of Babahoyo from 2008 to 2010.

Trávez Trávez was born in Toacazo, diocese of Latacunga. He studied in both Ecuador and Colombia at the Saint Buenaventura University, Bogotá where he completed his studies in philosophy. He made his solemn profession on 15 October 1965 and was ordained to the priesthood on 12 December 1970.

He founded the "Movement Juvenil Francisco" in Quito in 1969 was a member of Provincial Definitory, Master student of the Franciscan superior, priest, founder in 1982 of "Misioneras Franciscanas de la Juventud", Provincial Minister, President of "Unión de conferencias Latinoamericanas Franciscanas" and "Conferencia Franciscan Bolivarian".

He was appointed Titular Bishop of Sulletto and Vicar Apostolic of Zamora en Ecuador by Pope John Paul II on 14 January 2003 and consecrated on 15 March. He served as vicar apostolic until 27 March 2008 when he was appointed Bishop of Babahoyo. He was appointed Archbishop of Quito by Pope Benedict XVI on 11 September 2010. He received the pallium from Pope Benedict on 29 June 2011 in Rome.

Pope Francis accepted his resignation on 5 April 2019.

Catholic Church titles
Preceded by Jesús Ramón Martínez de Ezquerecocha Suso	Bishop of Babahoyo; 27 March 2008 – 22 October 2010	Succeeded by Marco Pérez Caicedo
Preceded by Raúl Eduardo Vela Chiriboga	Archbishop of Quito; 22 October – present	Succeeded by Incumbent
