= Luis Alberto Luna Tobar =

20th-century Ecuadorian Roman Catholic bishop and archbishop

Luis Alberto Luna Tobar, OCD
- Archdiocese of Cuenca Emeritus
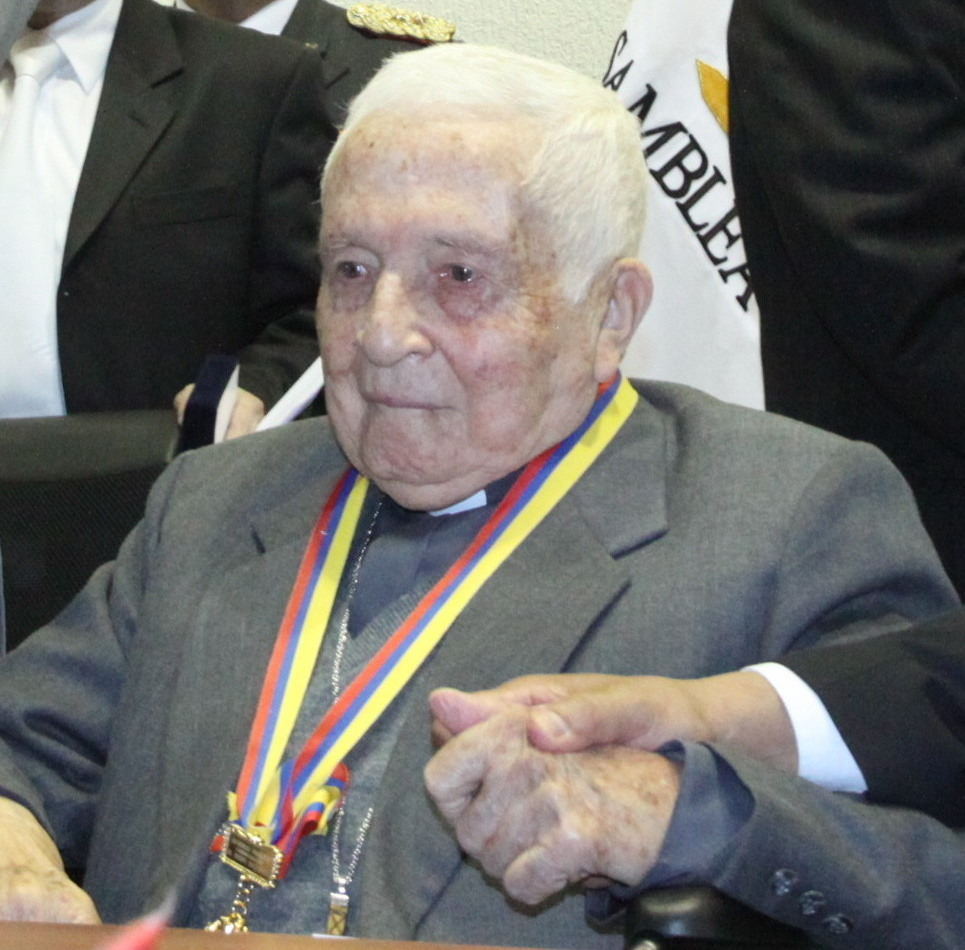
- Archdiocese: Archdiocese of Cuenca
- In office: 1981 - 2000
- Predecessor: Ernesto Alvarez Alvarez, SDB
- Successor: Vicente Rodrigo Cisneros Durán

Orders
- Ordination: June 23, 1946

Personal details
- Born: December 15, 1923; Quito, Ecuador
- Died: February 7, 2017 (aged 93)
- Motto: Ita Pater
- Coat of arms

Luis Alberto Luna Tobar OCD, (December 15, 1923 – February 7, 2017) was an Ecuadorian Discalced Carmelite and a prelate of the Roman Catholic Church. He was born in Quito, Ecuador, and was ordained a priest on June 23, 1946.

He was appointed auxiliary archbishop of Archdiocese of Quito as well as titular bishop of Mulli on August 17, 1977, and was ordained bishop on September 18, 1977, by Cardinal Pablo Muñoz Vega. He was appointed archbishop of Vicar Apostolic of Cuenca on May 7, 1981, and served until his retirement on February 15, 2000.

He died on February 7, 2017.
