= Antonio José González Zumárraga =

Ecuadorian Cardinal

- Cardinal, Archbishop Emeritus of Quito
- Antonio José González Zumárraga's coat of arms.
- See: Quito
- Installed: June 1, 1985
- Term ended: March 21, 2003
- Predecessor: Pablo Muñoz Vega
- Successor: Raúl Eduardo Vela Chiriboga

Orders
- Created cardinal: February 21, 2001

Personal details
- Born: March 18, 1925 Pujili, Ecuador
- Died: October 13, 2008 (aged 83) Sangolquí, Ecuador

Styles of Antonio González Zumárraga
- Reference style: His Eminence
- Spoken style: Your Eminence
- Informal style: Cardinal
- See: Quito (emeritus)

Antonio José González Zumárraga (March 18, 1925 – October 13, 2008) was an Ecuadorian Cardinal of the Catholic Church.

González Zumárraga was born in Pujili, Ecuador. He was ordained priest on July 29, 1951, following studies at the San José seminary in Quito and the Pontifical University of Salamanca, Spain, where he obtained a doctorate in canon law.

He was made auxiliary bishop of Quito on May 17, 1969 (with the titular diocese of Tagarata) and was consecrated as bishop in Quito on June 15, 1969, by Cardinal Pablo Muñoz Vega, SJ, Archbishop of Quito.

He was made Bishop of Machala on June 30, 1978, and then Coadjutor Archbishop of Quito on June 28, 1980. He succeeded to full governance of the Archdiocese on June 1, 1985.

He was created as a Cardinal Priest (Cardinal Priest of Santa Maria in Via) in 2001 by Pope John Paul II.
