= Bernardino Echeverría Ruiz =

His Eminence Bernardino Echeverría Ruiz OFM
- Archbishop Emeritus of Guayaquil
- Church: Roman Catholic Church
- Archdiocese: Guayaquil
- See: Guayaquil
- Appointed: 10 April 1969
- Term ended: 7 December 1989
- Predecessor: Cesar Antonio Mosquera Corral
- Successor: Juan Ignacio Larrea Holguín
- Other post: Cardinal-Priest of Santi Nereo ed Achilleo (1994-2000)
- Previous posts: Bishop of Ambato (1949-69); President of the Ecuadorian Episcopal Conference (1973-75; 1984-87); Apostolic Administrator of Ibarra (1990-95)

Orders
- Ordination: 4 July 1937 by Carlos María de la Torre
- Consecration: 4 December 1949 by Efrem Forni
- Created cardinal: 26 November 1994 by Pope John Paul II
- Rank: Cardinal-Priest

Personal details
- Born: Bernardino Carlos Guillermo Honorato Echeverría Ruiz; 12 November 1912 Cotacachi, Imbabura, Ecuador
- Died: 6 April 2000 (aged 87) Quito, Ecuador
- Buried: San Francisco church, Quito
- Parents: Carlos Echeverría Solórzano; Carmen Ruiz Solórzano
- Motto: Pax et Bonum
- Coat of arms

Bernardino Echeverría Ruiz OFM (born 12 November 1912 in Cotacachi, Imbabura, Ecuador and died on 6 April 2000 in Quito Ecuador) was a Roman Catholic Cardinal.

== Biography ==
He joined the Franciscan order in 1928, and was ordained in 1937. He attended the Pontifical University in Rome and obtained a B.A. degree in philosophy in 1941. Upon graduation he returned to Ecuador and performed many duties for the Franciscan order, started a religious magazine and established houses to care for the poor.

He was appointed Bishop of Ambato in 1949, then as Archbishop of Guayaquil in 1969 and retired in 1989.

He was a member of the International Academy of Franciscan History and was made a Cardinal by Pope John Paul II in 1994.

He was a member of the Marian Movement of Priests and provided his imprimatur for Father Stefano Gobbi's book: To the Priests, Our Lady's Beloved Sons.
