= Leonidas Proaño =

Ecuadorian Catholic priest and theologian (1910–1988)

- Bishop of Diocese of Riobamba
- Church: Roman Catholic Church
- See: Diocese of Riobamba
- In office: 1955–1985
- Predecessor: Alberto Maria Ordóñez Crespo
- Successor: Victor Alejandro Corral Mantilla

Orders
- Ordination: 29 June 1936
- Consecration: 26 May 1954 by Cardinal Opilio Rossi

Personal details
- Born: 29 January 1910 San Antonio de Ibarra, Ecuador
- Died: 30 August 1988 (aged 78) Quito, Ecuador
- Coat of arms

Styles of Leonidas Proaño
- Reference style: The Most Reverend
- Spoken style: Your Excellency
- Religious style: Monsignor
- Posthumous style: none

Leonidas Eduardo Proaño Villalba (1910–1988) was an Ecuadorian prelate and theologian who was born in San Antonio de Ibarra and died in Quito. He served as the bishop of Riobamba from 1954 to 1985. He was a candidate for the Nobel Peace Prize and is considered one of the most important figures in Ecuadorian liberation theology.

== Biography ==
Proaño was ordained as a priest in 1936 and soon became interested in the latest trends Catholic social doctrine. Within the Ibarra diocese, he created the Juventud Obrera Cristiana (Christian Youth Workers). He was named bishop of Riobamba in 1954. From his cathedral in Riobamba, he fought constantly to introduce social justice in relations with indigenous people and to promote indigenous access to public life and political power (he thus became known as "the bishop of the Indians").

He enthusiastically adopted the thesis of liberation theology. In 1960, he created the Escuelas Radiofónicas Populares, with a clear educational goal. In 1962, he created the Center of Studies and Social Action to aid the development of indigenous communities. In 1973, he was accused of guerrilla warfare and had to stand trial in Rome, but he was cleared of all charges. In 1976, he was jailed during the dictatorship of Guillermo Rodríguez Lara.

In 1985, he renounced the bishopric and was named president of the Pastoral Indígena.

== Writings ==
- Rupito (1953)
- Creo en el Hombre y en la Comunidad (1977)
- El Evangelio Subversivo (1987)
- Concienciación, Evangelización y Política (1987).

== Bibliography ==
- Leonidas Proaño: el obispo de los pobres, 1989, Francisco Enríquez Bermeo,

Catholic Church titles
Preceded by Alberto Maria Ordóñez Crespo	Bishop of Bolívar; 1954-1955 -	Succeeded by -
Preceded by -	Bishop of Riobamba; 1955 - 1985	Succeeded by Victor Alejandro Corral Mantilla
