= Cathedral Basilica of Our Lady of the Elevation, Ambato =

Coordinates: 1.2543°S 78.6228°W

Cathedral Basilica of Our Lady of the Elevation
- Basílica Catedral de Nuestra Señora de la Elevación
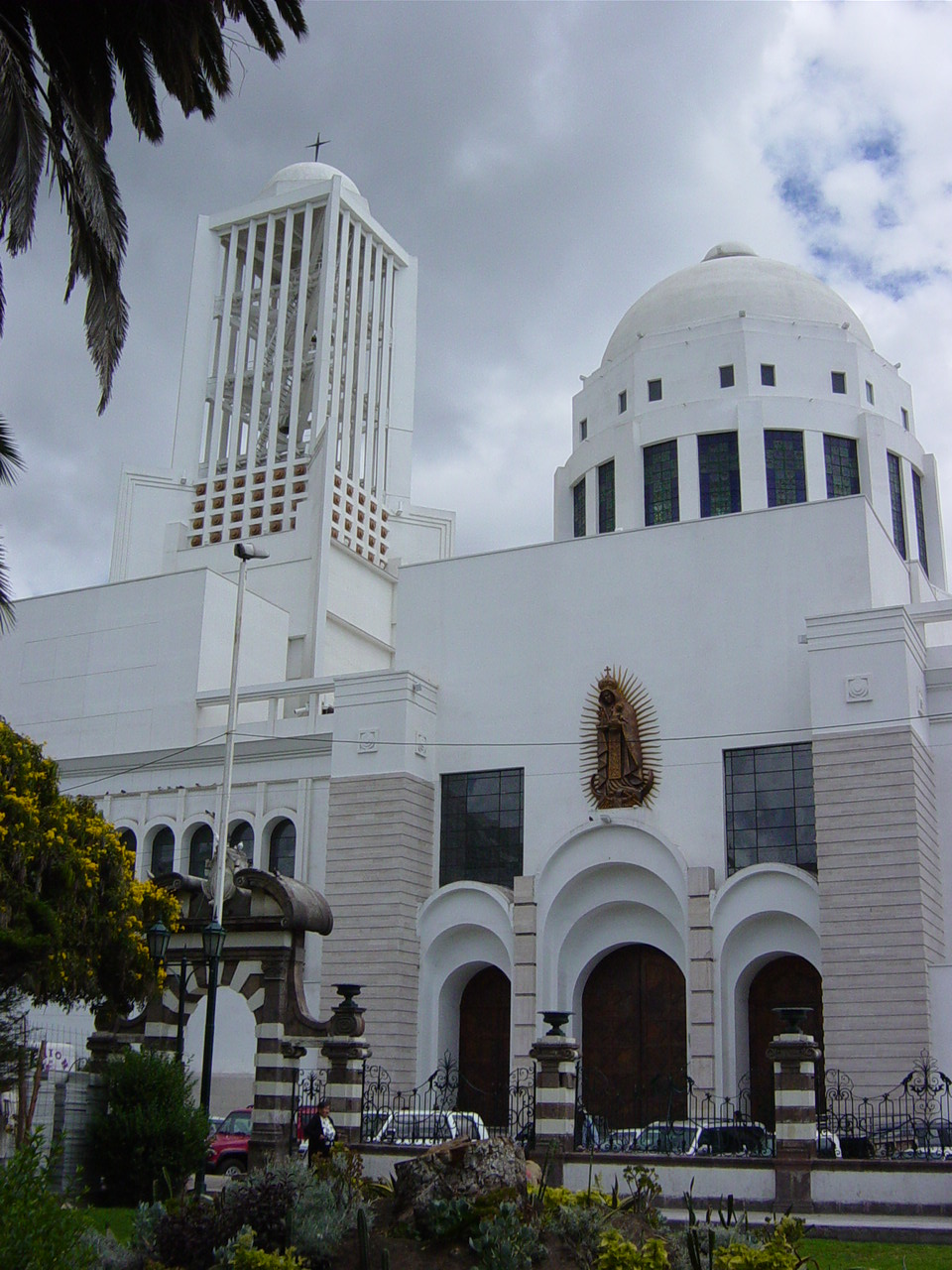
- Cathedral Basilica of Our Lady of the Elevation
- Location: Ambato
- Country: Ecuador
- Denomination: Roman Catholic Church

The Cathedral Basilica of Our Lady of the Elevation (Spanish: Basílica Catedral de Nuestra Señora de la Elevación) Also Ambato Cathedral is the name that receives a religious building that belongs to the Catholic Church and is located between Bolivar and Montalvo streets in front of the Juan Montalvo Park of the city of Ambato capital of the province of Tungurahua in the center of the South American country of Ecuador. It has the distinction of Minor Basilica since April 1961.

Its history goes back to 1698 when the original chapel was built that was destroyed by the earthquake of 1797. The church follows the Roman or Latin rite and is the seat of the Diocese of Ambato (Dioecesis Ambatensis) that was created in 1948 by Pope Pius XII through the bull Quae ad maius. The present temple was inaugurated in 1954 in replacement of another structure affected by an earthquake in 1949.

It is under the pastoral responsibility of Bishop Jorge Giovanny Pazmiño Abril since 2015.

== See also ==
- Roman Catholicism in Ecuador
- Our Lady Church

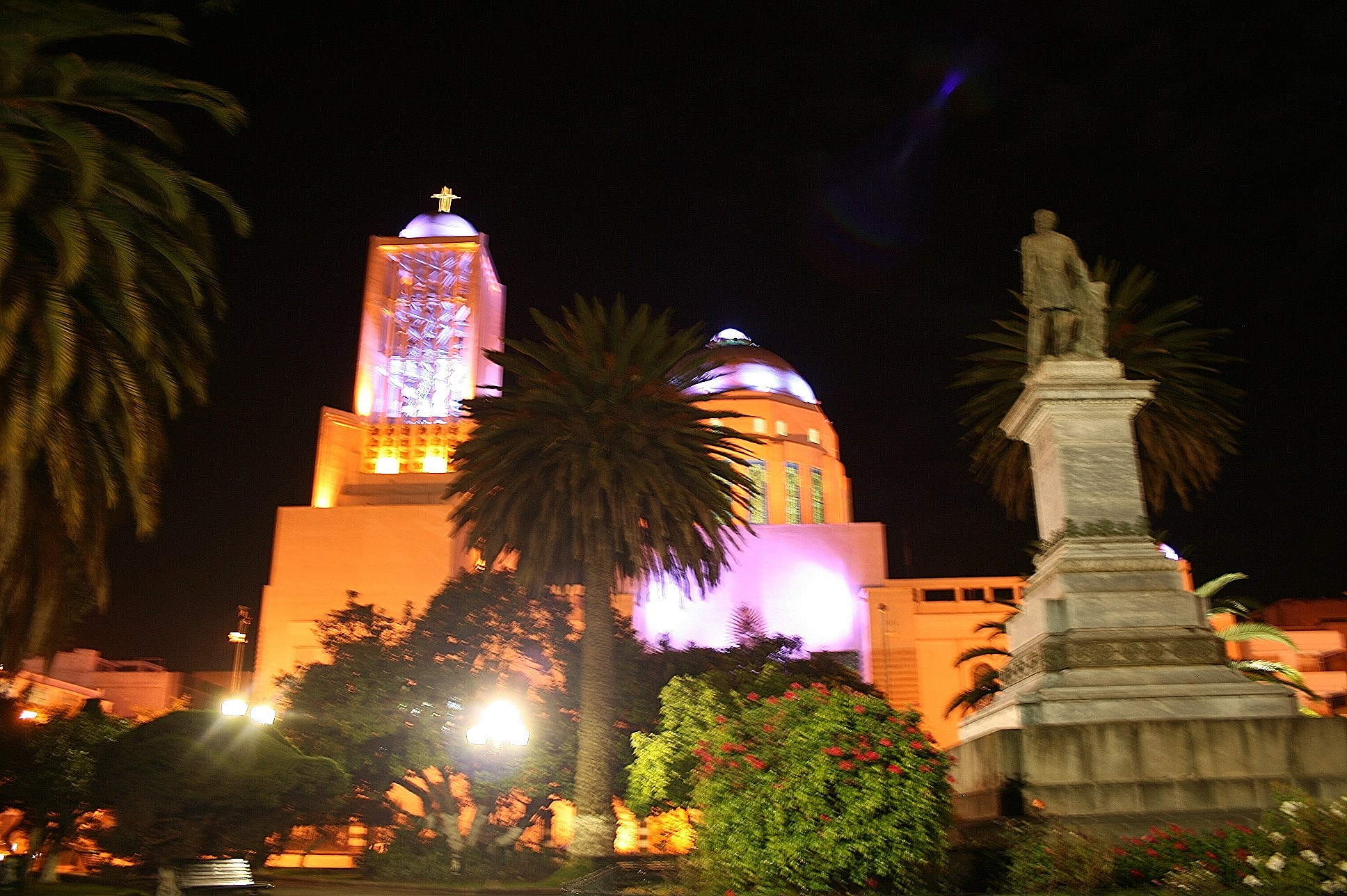
Another View
