= Our Lady of Mercy Cathedral, Machala =

Our Lady of Mercy Cathedral
- Catedral de Nuestra Señora de la Merced
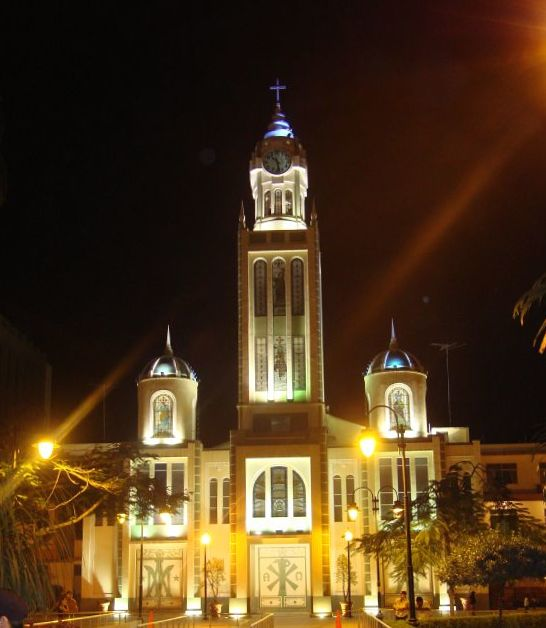
- Our Lady of Mercy Cathedral
- Location: Machala
- Country: Ecuador
- Denomination: Roman Catholic Church

The Our Lady of Mercy Cathedral (Spanish: Catedral de Nuestra Señora de la Merced) also called Machala Cathedral is a religious building of the Catholic Church is located in the Armas Central Square of the town of Machala, Machala Canton in the Province of El Oro in the southern part of the South American country of Ecuador.

The temple follows the Roman or Latin rite and functions as the headquarters of Diocese of Machala (Dioecesis Machalensis) that was created on January 31, 1969, with the bull Quem admodum of Pope Paul VI. It is under the pastoral responsibility of the Bishop Ángel Polibio Sánchez Loaiza.

It was built on an old cemetery and nearby is the Paseo de La Merced dedicated to the Virgin Mary. Its history dates back to 1747. In 1885, 1900 and 1928 underwent considerable renovations .

== See also ==
- Roman Catholicism in Ecuador
- Our Lady of Mercy
