= Archdiocese of Cuenca =

Catholic archdiocese in Ecuador

Coordinates: 2°53′57″S 79°00′55″W

Archdiocese of Cuenca Archidioecesis Conchensis in Aequatore

Catholic
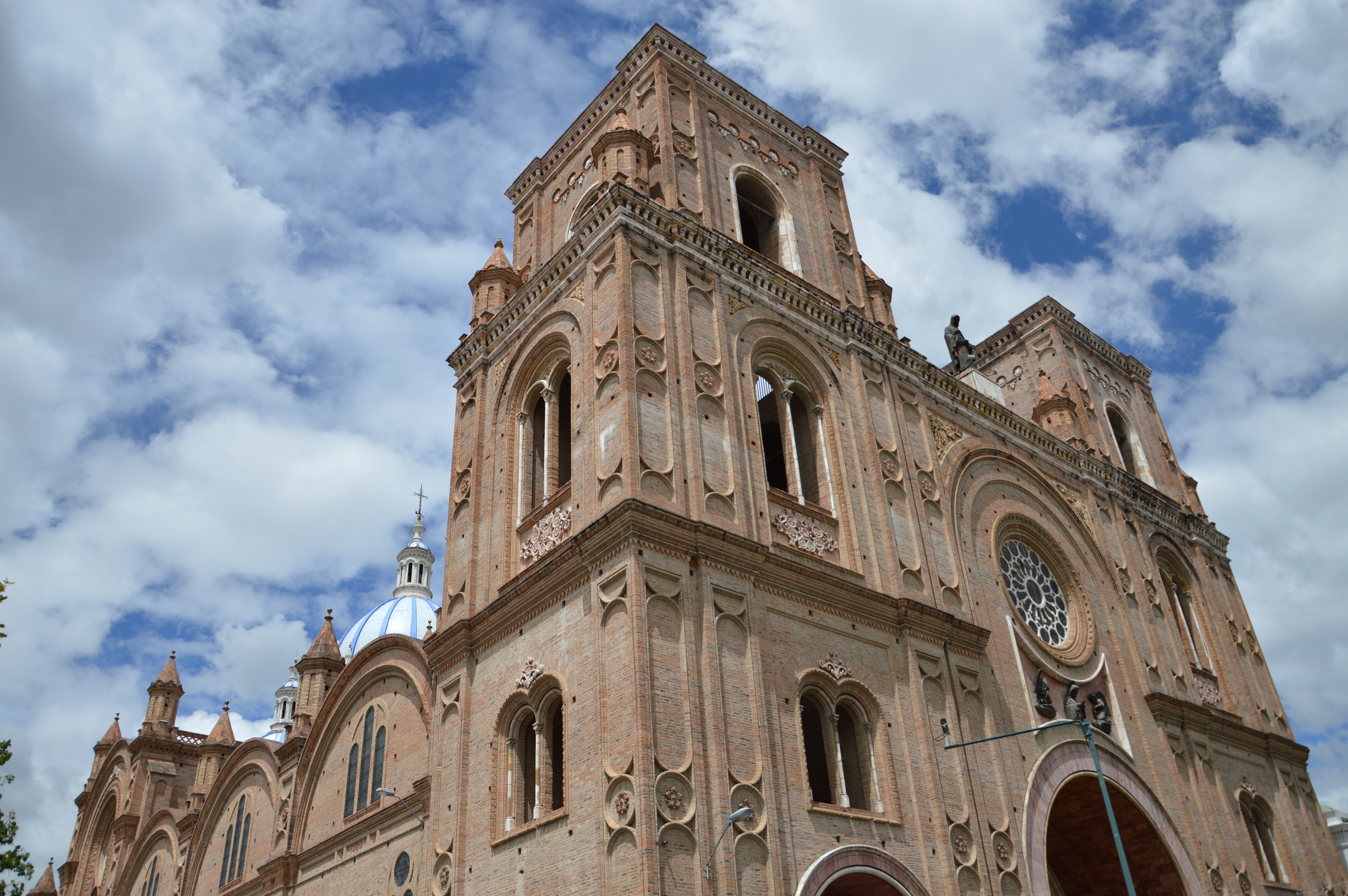
- Cathedral of the Immaculate Conception

Location
- Country: Ecuador
- Ecclesiastical province: Province of Azuay

Statistics
- Population: Total; Catholics: (as of 2006); 635,000; 604,000 (95.2)

Information
- Denomination: Catholic
- Rite: Latin Rite
- Established: 1 July 1786 (Erected as Diocese); 9 April 1957 (Elevated to Archdiocese)
- Cathedral: Catedral de la Inmaculada Concepción

Current leadership
- Pope: Leo XIV
- Archbishop: Marco Pérez Caicedo
- Auxiliary Bishops: Fernando Ortega Ortega

Map
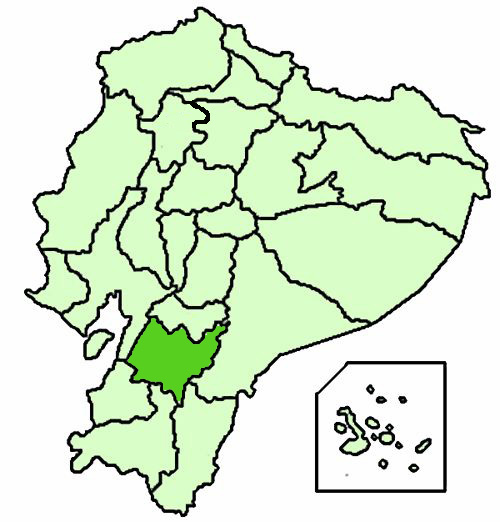

Website
- arquicuencaec.org

The Archdiocese of Cuenca (Latin: Archidioecesis Conchensis in Aequatore) is an archdiocese located in the city of Cuenca in Ecuador. Erected as the Diocese of Cuenca from territory of the Archdiocese of Quito on 1 July 1786, it was elevated to archdiocese status on 9 April 1957.

== Ordinaries ==
Bishops of Cuenca

- José Carrión y Marfil (18 Dec 1786 – 3 Jul 1798), appointed Bishop of Trujillo, Peru
- José Cuero y Caicedo (3 Jul 1798 – 23 Dec 1801), appointed Bishop of Quito
- Francisco Javier Fita y Carrión (y Lafita) (28 Mar 1803 – 24 May 1804)
- Andrés Quintian Ponte de Andrade (9 Sep 1805 – 24 Jun 1813)
- José Ignacio Cortázar y Labayen (15 Mar 1815 – 16 Jul 1818)
- Félix Calixto Miranda y Suárez de Figueroa (21 May 1827 – 1829)
- Pedro Antonio Torres (27 Jan 1843 – 17 Jan 1846)
- José Manuel Plaza de la Tejera, OFM (3 Jul 1848 – 22 Sep 1853)
- Giuseppe Antonio Remigio Esteves de Toral (22 Jul 1861 – 2 May 1883)
- Miguel León y Garrido (13 Nov 1884 – 31 Mar 1900)
- Manuel Maria Polit y Laso (11 Jan 1907 – 7 Jun 1918)
- Daniel Hermida Ortega (10 Mar 1918 – 30 Sep 1956)
- Manuel de Jesús Serrano Abad (16 Nov 1956 – 21 Apr 1971)
  - became archbishop on 9 April 1957

Archbishops of Cuenca

- Ernesto Alvarez Alvarez, SDB (21 Apr 1971 – 21 Jul 1980)
  - coadjutor archbishop 1970–1971
- Luis Alberto Luna Tobar, OCD (7 Mar 1981 – 15 Feb 2000)
- Vicente Rodrigo Cisneros Durán (15 Feb 2000 – 20 Apr 2009)
- Luis Cabrera Herrera, OFM (20 Apr 2009 – 24 September 2015), appointed Archbishop of Guayaquil
- Marco Pérez Caicedo (20 June 2016 – present)

=== Auxiliary bishops ===
- José Ignacio Checa y Barba (1861–1866), appointed Bishop of Ibarra
- Manuel de Jesús Serrano Abad (1954–1956), appointed Bishop here
- José Gabriel Diaz Cueva (1967–1968), appointed Bishop of Azogues
- José Bolivar Piedra Aguirre (2019–2022), appointed Bishop of Riobamba

=== Other priests of this diocese who became bishops ===
- Francisco Xavier de Garaycoa Llaguno, appointed Bishop of Guayaquil in 1838
- Oswaldo Patricio Vintimilla Cabrera, appointed Bishop of Azogues in 2016
- Alberto Maria Ordóñez Crespo, appointed Bishop of Ibarra in 1916
- Guillermo José Harris y Morales, appointed Bishop of Loja in 1920

== Suffragan dioceses ==
- Azogues
- Loja
- Machala

== Special churches ==
- Cathedral: Cathedral of the Immaculate Conception, Cuenca
- Minor Basilica: Basilica of the Perpetual Help, Cuenca

== See also ==
- Roman Catholicism in Ecuador

== Sources ==
- GCatholic.org
- Catholic Hierarchy
- Old Archdiocesan website
