= Ricardo Centellas =

Bolivian Catholic bishop (1962–2026)

The Most Reverend Ricardo Centellas
- Archbishop of Sucre
- Centellas in 2021
- Church: Catholic Church
- Archdiocese: Sucre
- Appointed: 11 February 2020
- Installed: 16 June 2020
- Term ended: 24 September 2026
- Predecessor: Jesús Juárez Párraga
- Successor: Sede vacante
- Other post: President of Episcopal Conference of Bolivia (2015–2021)
- Previous posts: Titular Bishop of Turres Ammeniae and Auxiliary Bishop of Potosí (2005–2009); Bishop of Potosí (2009–2020)

Orders
- Ordination: 11 August 1988
- Consecration: 15 September 2005 by Walter Pérez Villamonte, Jesús Gervasio Pérez Rodríguez and Ivo Scapolo

Personal details
- Born: 7 November 1962 Suquistaca, Chuquisaca Department, Bolivia
- Died: 24 September 2026 (aged 63) Oruro, Bolivia
- Education: Pontifical Gregorian University
- Motto: Deus spes mea
- Coat of arms: Ricardo Centellas's coat of arms

Styles of Ricardo Ernesto Centellas Guzmán
- Reference style: His Excellency; The Most Reverend
- Spoken style: Your Excellency
- Religious style: Archbishop

Ricardo Ernesto Centellas Guzmán (7 November 1962 – 24 September 2026) was a Bolivian Roman Catholic prelate who served as Archbishop of Sucre from 2020 until his death in 2026. He previously served as Bishop of Potosí from 2009 to 2020 and as auxiliary bishop of Potosí from 2005 to 2009. He was president of the Episcopal Conference of Bolivia from 2015 to 2018 and was re-elected to the position in 2018 until 2021.

== Early life and education ==
Centellas was born on 7 November 1962 in Suquistaca, in the Chuquisaca Department of Bolivia, within the Archdiocese of Sucre. An account published by Erbol following his death identified his birthplace as Camargo, in Nor Cinti Province, Chuquisaca.

He completed his primary and secondary education in Caiza D Municipality, Potosí Department. In 1982 he attended a preparatory seminary course at the San Cristóbal Seminary in Sucre. From 1983 to 1988, he studied philosophy and theology at the San José Seminary in Cochabamba.

Centellas was ordained a priest for the Archdiocese of Sucre on 11 August 1988. From January 1989 to April 1991 he served as parochial vicar of San Juan Bautista parish in Padilla. He then studied at the Pontifical Gregorian University in Rome, where he obtained a licentiate in spiritual theology in 1993.

After returning to Bolivia, he joined the formation staff of the San Cristóbal Seminary. He served as rector of the seminary from 1996 to 2003 and as vicar general of the Archdiocese of Sucre from 1998 until his appointment as a bishop in 2005.

== Episcopal ministry ==
On 30 June 2005, Pope Benedict XVI appointed Centellas auxiliary bishop of Potosí and titular bishop of Turres Ammeniae. He received episcopal consecration on 15 September 2005, with Bishop Walter Pérez Villamonte as principal consecrator and Archbishop Jesús Gervasio Pérez Rodríguez and Archbishop Ivo Scapolo as principal co-consecrators. Centellas participated in the Synod of Bishops' 12th Ordinary General Assembly in October 2008, where he was listed as titular bishop of Turres Ammeniae and auxiliary bishop of Potosí. On 25 November 2009, Pope Benedict XVI appointed Centellas bishop of Potosí, succeeding Walter Pérez Villamonte. He took possession of the diocese on 28 January 2010.

== Bolivian Episcopal Conference ==
Centellas held several positions within the Episcopal Conference of Bolivia, including president of the Area of Ecclesial Communion, membership of the Permanent Episcopal Council and the council of the theological faculty San Pablo in Cochabamba, and service as substitute delegate of the conference to the CELAM. He was vice president of the Bolivian Episcopal Conference from 2012 to 2015, and the second time, from 2021 until 2026.

In November 2015, the 100th General Assembly of the Bolivian Episcopal Conference elected Centellas president for the 2015–2018 term. He was re-elected in 2018 until 2021.

== Archbishop of Sucre ==
On 11 February 2020, Pope Francis accepted the resignation of Archbishop Jesús Juárez Párraga and appointed Centellas metropolitan archbishop of Sucre, transferring him from the Diocese of Potosí. He was installed on 16 June 2020. In February 2021, Centellas additionally received the title of Archbishop Primate of Bolivia, associated with the metropolitan see of Sucre. During his tenure as archbishop, Centellas was involved in religious, educational and social activities in Chuquisaca. He also served as Grand Chancellor of the Bolivian Catholic University and participated in activities associated with the university's expansion in Bolivia.

== Death ==
Centellas died on 24 September 2026 in Oruro, Bolivia, while participating in activities marking the anniversary of the Bolivian Catholic University. His death was confirmed by his family; he was 63. His remains were initially kept in Oruro while arrangements were made for their transfer to Sucre.

Catholic Church titles
Preceded by Jesús Juárez Párraga	Archbishop of Sucre; 2020–2026	Succeeded by Sede vacante
Preceded by Walter Pérez Villamonte	Bishop of Potosí; 2009–2020	Succeeded by Nicolás Renán Aguilera Arroyo
Preceded by José Francisco Rezende Dias	Titular Bishop of Turres Ammeniae; 2005–2009	Succeeded by Lucio Lemmo
Preceded by —	Auxiliary Bishop of Potosí; 2005–2009	Succeeded by —
