= Walter Pérez Villamonte =

Bolivian Roman Catholic bishop (1936–2018)

- Bishop of Potosí
- Church: Catholic Church
- Diocese: Diocese of Potosí
- In office: 7 March 1998 – 25 November 2009
- Predecessor: Edmundo Luis Flavio Abastoflor Montero
- Successor: Ricardo Centellas
- Previous posts: Titular Bishop of Curubis (1995-1998); Auxiliary Bishop of Sucre (1995-1998)

Orders
- Ordination: 11 January 1959 by José Clemente Maurer
- Consecration: 2 February 1996 by Jesús Gervasio Pérez Rodríguez

Personal details
- Born: 3 November 1936 Vilacaya (southeast of Belén), Potosí Department, Republic of Bolivia
- Died: 29 March 2018 (aged 81) Sucre, Bolivia

Walter Pérez Villamonte (3 November 1936 – 29 March 2018) was a Bolivian Roman Catholic bishop.

Pérez Villamonte was born in Bolivia and was ordained to the priesthood in 1962. He served as auxiliary bishop of the Roman Catholic Archdiocese of Sucre, Bolivia, from 1995 to 1998, holding the titular bishopric of Curubis. He then served as bishop of the Roman Catholic Diocese of Potosí, Bolivia, from 1998 to 2009.
