= Third Mexican Provincial Council =

The Third Mexican Provincial Council was a 1585 provincial council of the Catholic Church in the Archdiocese of Mexico. Unlike the first two Mexican Provincial Councils, it was approved by the Holy See. It called for reform of the repartimiento system of Indian labor.

== Attendees ==
Pedro Moya de Contreras, the archbishop of Mexico, opened the council on January 20, 1585, and ran until October 20, 1585. The other bishops in attendance were:

- Pedro Gómez de Córdoba, the bishop of Guatemala
- Juan de Medina Rincón y de la Vega, the bishop of Michoacán
- Diego de Romano y Govea, the bishop of Tlaxcala
- Gregorio de Montalvo Olivera, the bishop of Yucatán
- Domingo de Alzola, the bishop of Guadalajara
- Bartolomé de Ledesma, the bishop of Oaxaca

== Topics ==
=== Repartimientos ===
The council dealt in large part with the topic of Indian labor. Consiliar decrees ordered that clergy cease the practice of using unpaid native labor for personal service and construction work.

Hernando Ortiz de Hinojosa, the vicar-general of Mexico, submitted a series of dubia to the council regarding the repartimiento system of indigenous labor. He questioned whether the repartimiento system was permissible at all; whether repartimiento labor, originally intended for public works, could legitimately be used for private profit; and whether repartimiento labor could be used specifically in the silver mines, known for their severe conditions.

The council submitted a list of questions, based closely on Hinojosa's, to a group of Franciscan scholars and theologians for advice. This group included Hinojosa himself, Pedro de Pravia, Melchor de los Reyes, Juan de la Plaza, Alonso Ponce, Pedro de San Sebastián, Juan Zurnero, Fulgencio de Vega y Vique, Pedro Morales, Juan de Salcedo, and the members of the Convent of San Francisco. The Franciscans responded with a sweeping rejection of the repartimiento system, denouncing it as "illegal and evil and full of cruelty" in all its forms.

Ultimately, the council passed a somewhat qualified series of resolutions, condemning the repartimientos "in the manner in which they are now carried out" and calling for reforms from the governor. The council also petitioned King Philip II of Spain for relief for the Indians from the repartimiento system.

=== Other topics ===
The council ordered that schools should be established to teach basic Spanish literacy to Indians. It banned a number of practices which were believed to lead to idolatry, including certain popular festivals, as well as the depiction of animals, demons, or stars alongside saints in sacred images. It elaborated on an existing decree that candidates for baptism should have "a good understanding of Christian doctrine", laying out requirements that they should learn several prayers and the Ten Commandments in their native language.

It also reiterated a number of decrees from the Council of Trent. These covered topics regarding the communion of saints and the veneration of images, and ordered churches to keep records of baptisms, confirmations, marriages, and funerals.

== Publications ==
The council's published documents included:

- their decrees
- statutes of the cathedral chapter
- three catechisms, use of which was required on pain of excommunication
- the Directorio para confesores y penitentes
- a list of court fees
- a set of sacramental rituals

The decrees received papal approval in 1589, and were published in 1623. The catechisms received royal approval in 1621.
