= Álvaro Manrique de Zúñiga, 1st Marquess of Villamanrique =

Mexican politician

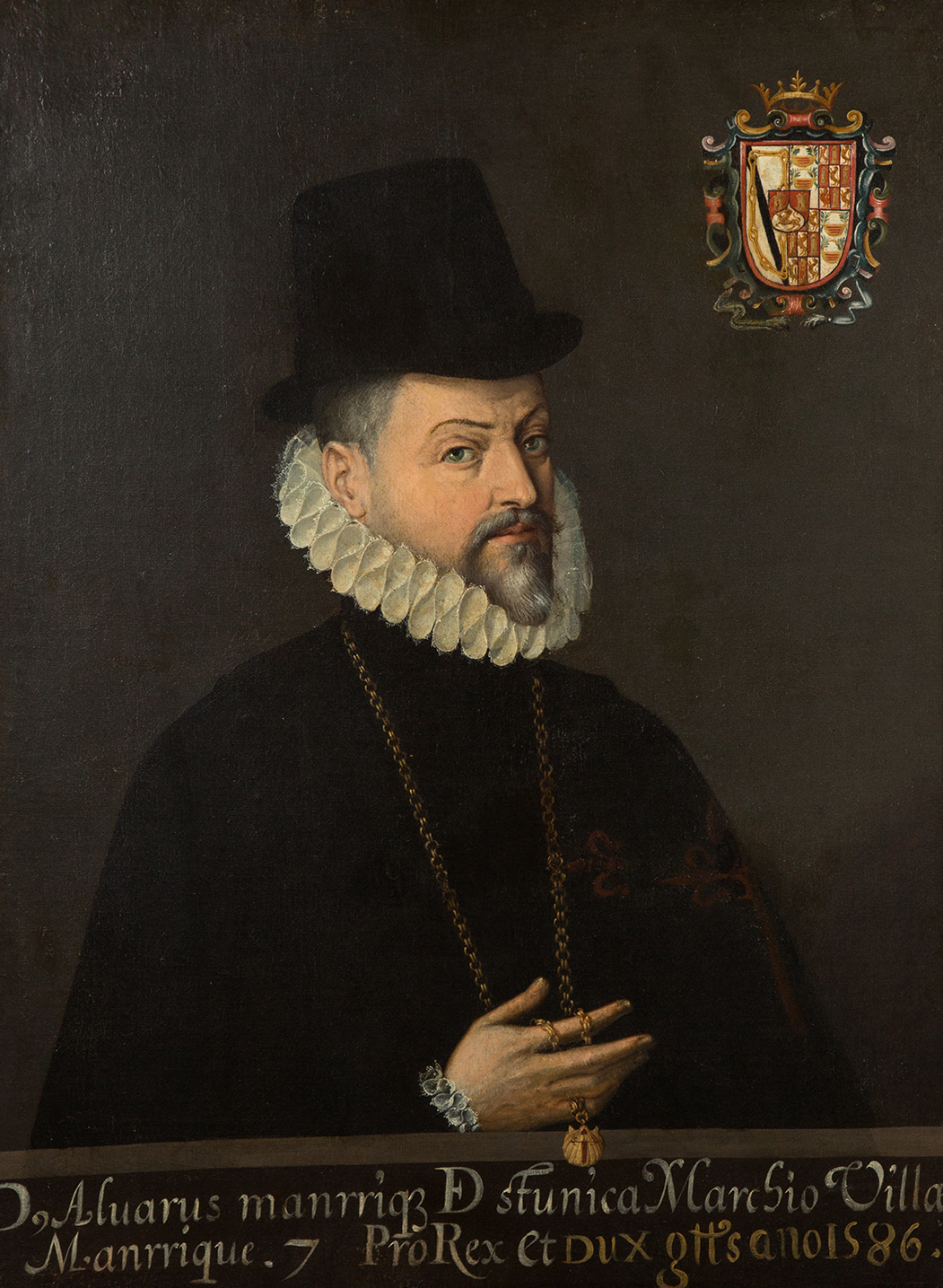
Álvaro Manrique de Zúñiga

Álvaro Manrique de Zúñiga, 1st Marquess of Villamanrique (Spanish: Álvaro Manrique de Zúñiga, primer marqués de Villamanrique) (d. 1590, in Spain), Spanish nobleman and the seventh viceroy of New Spain. He governed from October 17, 1585, to January 26, 1590.

== Early life and appointment as viceroy ==
Born in Spain in the decade of the 1540s, Manrique de Zúñiga was a younger son of the fourth Duke of Béjar, Francisco de Zúñiga y Sotomayor. He served the Spanish Crown with such efficiency and loyalty that King Philip II rewarded him in 1575 with the title of Marqués de Villamanrique.

On February 26, 1585, Philip II named him viceroy of New Spain to succeed Pedro Moya de Contreras. At this time Manrique de Zúñiga had lived for several years in Seville, where he had gained indirect experience with the Indies. In his case, the king made the choice personally, rather than relying on the recommendation of the Council of the Indies, as was the case ordinarily. He remained in Spain for a few months before leaving for the New World. He arrived in San Juan de Ulúa (Veracruz) on September 7, 1585, with his wife. Shortly thereafter he made his formal entry into Mexico City to take up his office.

== Administration ==
Manrique de Zúñiga began his administration by completing the regulations introduced by the previous viceroy governing the sale of wine in the colony, and the location of taverns.

In 1586 the conflict between the regular clergy and secular clergy involving questions of prerogatives and jurisdiction erupted again. This was a continuation of the conflict between those parties during the administration of Viceroy Martín Enríquez de Almanza. The friars (regular clergy) had the support of the people, but the regulars were supported by the viceroy and by the nobles. Clergy of the Dominican, Augustinian and Franciscan orders were bitter opponents of this viceroy.

Depredations by pirates continued. On August 6, 1587, the port of Huatulco (Oaxaca) fell to English corsair Thomas Cavendish, and on September 3, 1587, he sacked Navidad (Jalisco). Cavendish also captured the Manila galleon Santa Ana off Baja California on November 15, 1587. Each Manila galleon was loaded with a year's worth of treasure from the Philippines en route to Acapulco for ultimate delivery to Spain.

Manrique de Zúñiga's response included the establishment of a militia of volunteers to defend Pacific ports and the arming of Spanish ships to fight the pirates at sea.

Manrique took important steps toward ending the long-running Chichimeca War on New Spain's northern frontiers which threatened communications with silver mines near the city of Zacatecas. The Spanish policy of defeating and enslaving the Chichimecas had been unsuccessful. Manrique, following the advice of Churchmen, implemented a new approach to the war. He removed many Spanish soldiers from the frontier as they were considered more a provocation than a remedy. He opened negotiations with Chichimeca leaders and promised them food, clothing, land, priests, and tools to encourage them through “gentle persuasion” to settle down. He forbade military operations to seek out and capture and kill hostile Indians. The results were favorable. By 1590, he declared the roads to Zacatecas safe (for the first time in 40 years) and the war slowly wound down.

== His fall ==
In 1588 the viceroy was involved in a jurisdictional dispute with the Audiencia de Guadalajara. This newly founded Audiencia had been functioning independently of the Audiencia of Mexico City, and virtually independently of the viceroy. Manrique's attempts to asserts his authority were viewed as arbitrary, and were met with considerable hostility. Allegations against him of tyranny, cupidity, nepotism, censorship of letters from New Spain to Spain, and other abuses were made against him with the Council of the Indies. The majority of the charges were false or exaggerated, but the colony seemed to be on the verge of civil war.

The bishop of Puebla, Diego de Romano, was named visitador (royal inspector) to deal with the crisis. Romanos was an enemy of Manrique, because of their opposite sides in the earlier secular-regular conflict. He worked passionately to oppose the viceroy, and seized his property. This seizure was subsequently lifted by the Council of the Indies, but that ruling was ignored in New Spain, and the viceroy was consigned to poverty.

Manrique continued as viceroy until January, 1590, when his successor, Luis de Velasco, marqués de Salinas arrived in Mexico City to take over the administration. Manrique was forced to remain a few more years in New Spain, as the subject of a lawsuit. He was still destitute, and also ill. He was finally able to return to Spain and seek restitution, but he died shortly after reaching Madrid, impoverished and bitter.
