= Cannalonga =

- Comune
- Comune di Cannalonga
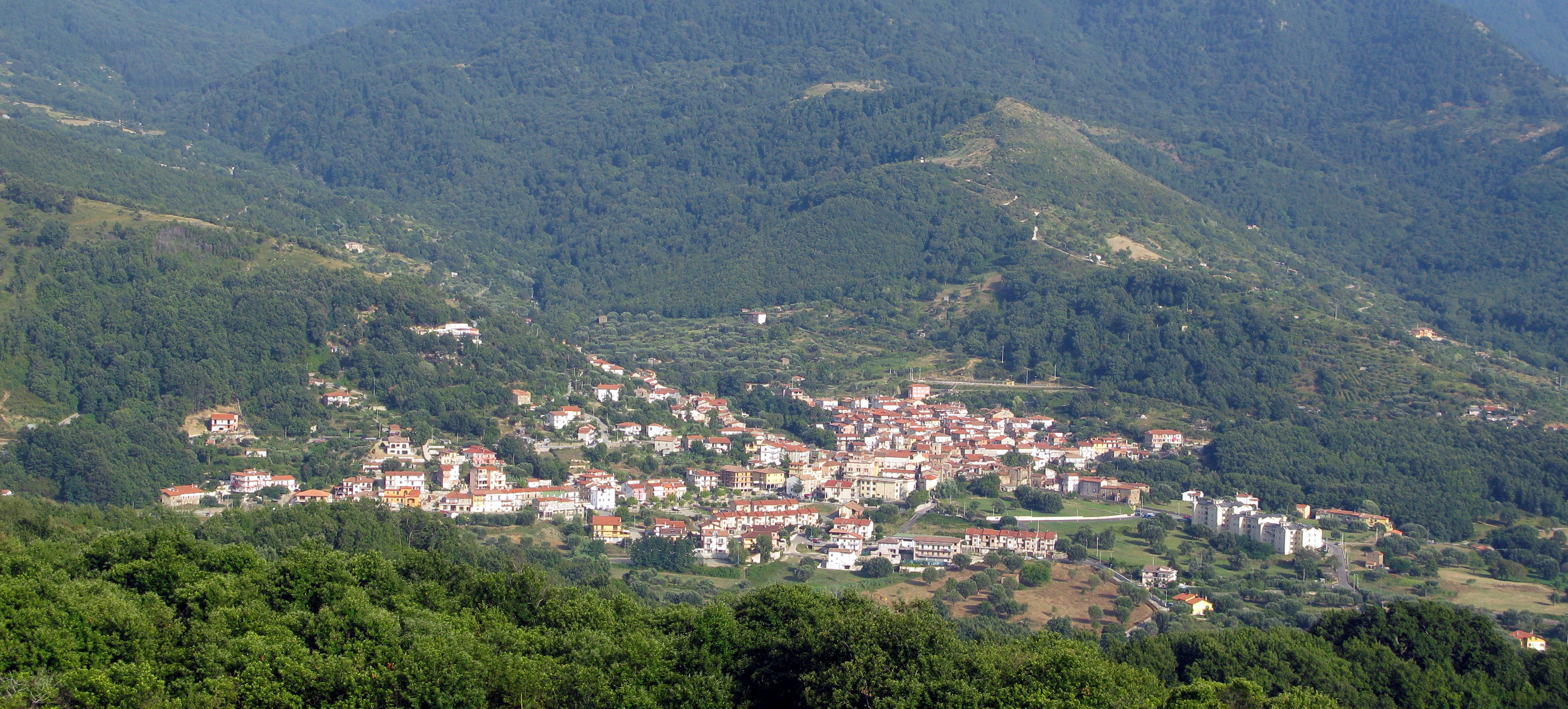
- The town of Cannalonga

- Coat of arms

- Location within Italy Location within Campania
- Coordinates: 40°15′N 15°18′E
- Country: Italy
- Region: Campania
- Province: Salerno (SA)

Government
  - Mayor: Toribio Tangredi

Area
  - Total: 17 km^{2} (6.6 sq mi)
- Elevation: 570 m (1,870 ft)

Population (31 December 2010)
  - Total: 1,098
  - Density: 65/km^{2} (170/sq mi)
- Demonym: Cannalonghesi
- Time zone: UTC+1 (CET)
  - Summer (DST): UTC+2 (CEST)
- Postal code: 84040
- Dialing code: 0974
- ISTAT code: 065024
- Patron saint: Saint Turibius of Mongrovejo
- Website: Official website

Cannalonga is a town and comune in the Province of Salerno, Campania, southern Italy.

== History ==
The town was founded between the 9th/10th century AD.

It became well known in the region around 1450, when the tradition of the festival called Fiera di Santa Lucia started. Today this festival is better known as Fiera della Frecagnola.

The most popular historical monument there is the "Palazzo Ducale" (the duke's palace), which is located in the heart of the town, facing Piazza del Popolo. The palace belongs to the Dukes of Cannalonga, the Mogrovejo-Romano family.

== Etymology ==
According to some people, this name is due to the large number of bamboo-stems (it:canne di bambù) present in the area. According to others the name is referred to an old measure unit called "canna".

== Cuisine ==
Traditional meals include:

- Laane e ciciari (large tagliatelle and chickpeas)
- Fusilli al sugo di castrato (local pasta with tomato sauce and castrated lamb meat)
- Tiano (Easter 'poor man' meal based on pastry with sweetcorn, milk and cheese)
- Pizza chiena (Easter pie based on rice, eggs, cheese and salami)
- Bollito di capra (boiled goat meat based on an old, traditional recipe. Served as a speciality during the festival 'Fiera della Frecagnola')

== Special events ==
- March 23: Celebration for Turibius of Mongrovejo
- July: Sagra del Fusillo
- July 16: Celebration for Madonna del Carmine.
- 2nd Saturday of September: Fiera della Frecagnola

== See also ==
- Cilento
- Pruno Cilento
