= Diocese of Tarija =

Catholic ecclesiastical territory

Diocese of Tarija Dioecesis Tariiensis Diócesis de Tarija

Catholic

Location
- Country: Bolivia
- Ecclesiastical province: Sucre
- Metropolitan: Sucre

Statistics
- Area: 37,623 km^{2} (14,526 sq mi)
- Population: Total; Catholics: (as of 2010); 492,000; 348,034 (70.7%)
- Parishes: 22

Information
- Denomination: Roman Catholic
- Rite: Roman Rite
- Established: 11 November 1924 (101 years ago)
- Cathedral: Cathedral Basilica of Our lady of Peace in Tarija

Current leadership
- Pope: Leo XIV
- Bishop: Jorge Ángel Saldías Pedraza, O.P.
- Metropolitan Archbishop: Ricardo Ernesto Centellas Guzmán
- Bishops emeritus: Francisco Javier Del Río Sendino

Map

The Roman Catholic Diocese of Tarija (Latin: Dioecesis Tariiensis) is a diocese located in the city of Tarija in the ecclesiastical province of Sucre in Bolivia.

== History ==
- November 11, 1924: Established as Diocese of Tarija from the Archdiocese of Sucre

== Leadership (in reverse chronological order) ==
- Bishops of Tarija (Roman rite)
  - Bishop Jorge Ángel Saldías Pedraza, O.P. (October 11, 2019 – present)
  - Bishop Francisco Javier Del Río Sendino (January 10, 2006 – October 11, 2019)
  - Bishop Adhemar Esquivel Kohenque (October 20, 1995 – June 2, 2004)
  - Bishop Abel Costas Montaño (December 11, 1974 – October 20, 1995)
  - Bishop Juan Niccolai, O.F.M. (August 16, 1947 – 1974)
  - Bishop Ramón Font y Farrés, C.M.F. (November 17, 1924 – August 16, 1947)

== Coadjutor bishops ==
- Juan Niccolai, O.F.M. (1944–1947)
- Adhemar Esquivel Kohenque (1992–1995)

== See also ==
- Roman Catholicism in Bolivia
