= Turres Concordiae =

Africa Roman map

Turres Concordiae is a titular see of the Roman Catholic Church, North Africa. The ancient bishopric was founded in the Roman province of Numidia, Roman North Africa. The exact location of its seat and cathedra, though is not known. However, its name indicates its cathedra was founded in proximity to a fort and it is possible that (like many towns in North Africa with the name Turres) this town was located on the African Limes.

The diocese ceased to effectively function in the 7th century with the Muslim conquest of the Maghreb, but was re-founded, at least in name, in the 20th century as a titular see and the current Bishop is Salvatore Angerami. who replaced Joseph Frans Lescrauwaet in 2014.
