= Adhemar Esquivel Kohenque =

Roman Catholic bishop

- Bishop of Tarija
- Church: Catholic Church
- Diocese: Diocese of Tarija
- In office: 20 October 1995 – 2 June 2004
- Predecessor: Abel Costas Montaño
- Successor: Francisco Javier Del Río Sendino
- Previous posts: Coadjutor Bishop of Tarija (1992-1995); Titular Bishop of Caere (1968-1992); Auxiliary Bishop of La Paz (1968-1992)

Orders
- Ordination: 30 October 1960
- Consecration: 6 January 1969 by Pope Paul VI

Personal details
- Born: 22 April 1929
- Died: 17 July 2013 (aged 84)

Adhemar Esquivel Kohenque (22 April 1929 – 17 July 2013) was a Roman Catholic bishop.

Ordained to the priesthood in 1960, Esquivel Kohenque was named bishop in 1968. In 1992 he was named coadjutor bishop of the Diocese of Tarija, Bolivia and became the diocesan bishop in 1995. He retired in 2004.

He served as a co-consecrator at the consecration of Bishop Juan Vargas Aruquipa.
