= Salvatore Angerami =

Italian Roman Catholic bishop (1956–2019)

Coat of arms of Salvatore Angerami.

Salvatore Angerami (26 November 1956 – 7 July 2019) was an Italian Roman Catholic prelate, who served as an auxiliary bishop of Roman Catholic Archdiocese of Naples, and titular bishop of Turres Concordiae, North Africa.

He was ordained on 22 June 1997. On 27 September 2014 he was named by Pope Francis as titular bishop of Turres Concordiae and auxiliary bishop of Naples. The episcopal ordination was on 8 November 2014. Co-consecrators were the auxiliary bishops Lucio Lemmo (titular bishop of Turres Ammeniae) and Gennaro Acampa . He died on 7 July 2019.
