= Juan de Medina Rincón y de la Vega =

Spanish Roman Catholic prelate

Most Reverend Juan de Medina Rincón y de la Vega
- Bishop of Michoacán
- Church: Catholic Church
- In office: 1574–1588
- Predecessor: Antonio Ruíz de Morales y Molina
- Successor: Alfonso Guerra

Orders
- Consecration: 5 December 1574 by Pedro de Moya y Contreras

Personal details
- Born: 27 December 1520 Medina del Campo, Spain
- Died: 30 June 1588 (age 67) Michoacán

Juan de Medina Rincón y de la Vega, O.S.A. (27 December 1520 – 30 June 1588) was a Roman Catholic prelate who served as Bishop of Michoacán (1574–1588).

== Biography ==
Juan de Medina Rincón y de la Vega was born on 27 December 1520 in Medina del Campo, Spain and ordained a priest in the Order of Saint Augustine. On 18 June 1574, he was appointed during the papacy of Pope Gregory XIII as Bishop of Michoacán. On 5 December 1574, he was consecrated bishop by Pedro de Moya y Contreras, Archbishop of México, with Antonio Ruíz de Morales y Molina, Bishop of Tlaxcala, serving as co-consecrator.

While bishop, he was the principal co-consecrator of Alfonso Graniero Avalos, Bishop of La Plata o Charcas (1579). In 1585, he attended the Third Mexican Provincial Council.

He served as Bishop of Michoacán until his death on 30 June 1588.

== External links and additional sources ==
- Cheney, David M. "Archdiocese of Morelia". Catholic-Hierarchy.org. (for Chronology of Bishops) ^{[self-published]}
- Chow, Gabriel. "Metropolitan Archdiocese of Morelia (Mexico)". GCatholic.org. (for Chronology of Bishops) ^{[self-published]}

Catholic Church titles
Preceded by Antonio Ruíz de Morales y Molina	Bishop of Michoacán; 1574–1588	Succeeded by Alfonso Guerra (bishop)
