= Episcopal Conference of Bolivia =

Assembly of Catholic bishops in Bolivia

Bolivian Episcopal Conference
- Conferencia Episcopal Boliviana
- Abbreviation: CEB
- Formation: 1958
- Type: Episcopal conference
- Purpose: To support the ministry of bishops
- Headquarters: La Paz
- Region served: Bolivia
- Members: Active and retired Catholic bishops of Bolivia
- President: Aurelio Pesoa Ribera
- Website: ceb.bo

The episcopate of the country is the Bolivian Episcopal Conference (Spanish: Conferencia Episcopal Boliviana, CEB). Its highest authority is the plenary assembly of bishops, acting through the Permanent Council of Bishops, which coordinates the activities of Catholic Church and implement the decisions of the Plenary Assembly and the Secretary General who is the organ of information and coordination of activities national character of the CEB. The Episcopal Conference is then composed of 17 committees (or departments) study of themes and specific issues that concern the catechesis, the liturgy, the Bible, the clergy, consecrated life, the laity, the social ministry, social communication, education, etc.

The CEB is a member of the Latin American Episcopal Conference.

== Presidents ==
List of presidents of the Bishops' Conference:

1958–1968: Abel Antezana Isidoro y Rojas, archbishop of La Paz

1968–1979: José Clemente Maurer, archbishop of Sucre

1979–1980: José Armando Gutiérrez Granier, Archbishop of Cochabamba

1980–1985: Luis Aníbal Rodríguez Pardo, archbishop of Santa Cruz de la Sierra

1985–1991: Julio Terrazas Sandoval, Bishop of Oruro

1991–1997: Luis Flavio Edmundo Abastoflor Montero, bishop of Potosí and Archbishop of La Paz

1997–2012 Julio Terrazas Sandoval, archbishop of Santa Cruz de la Sierra

2012–2015 Oscar Omar Aparicio Céspedes

2015–2021 Ricardo Ernesto Centellas Guzmán

2021– Aurelio Pesoa Ribera, OFM

== See also ==
- Catholic Church in Bolivia
