= Diocese of Potosí =

Catholic ecclesiastical territory

Diocese of Potosí Dioecesis Potosiensis in Bolivia Diócesis de Potosí

Catholic
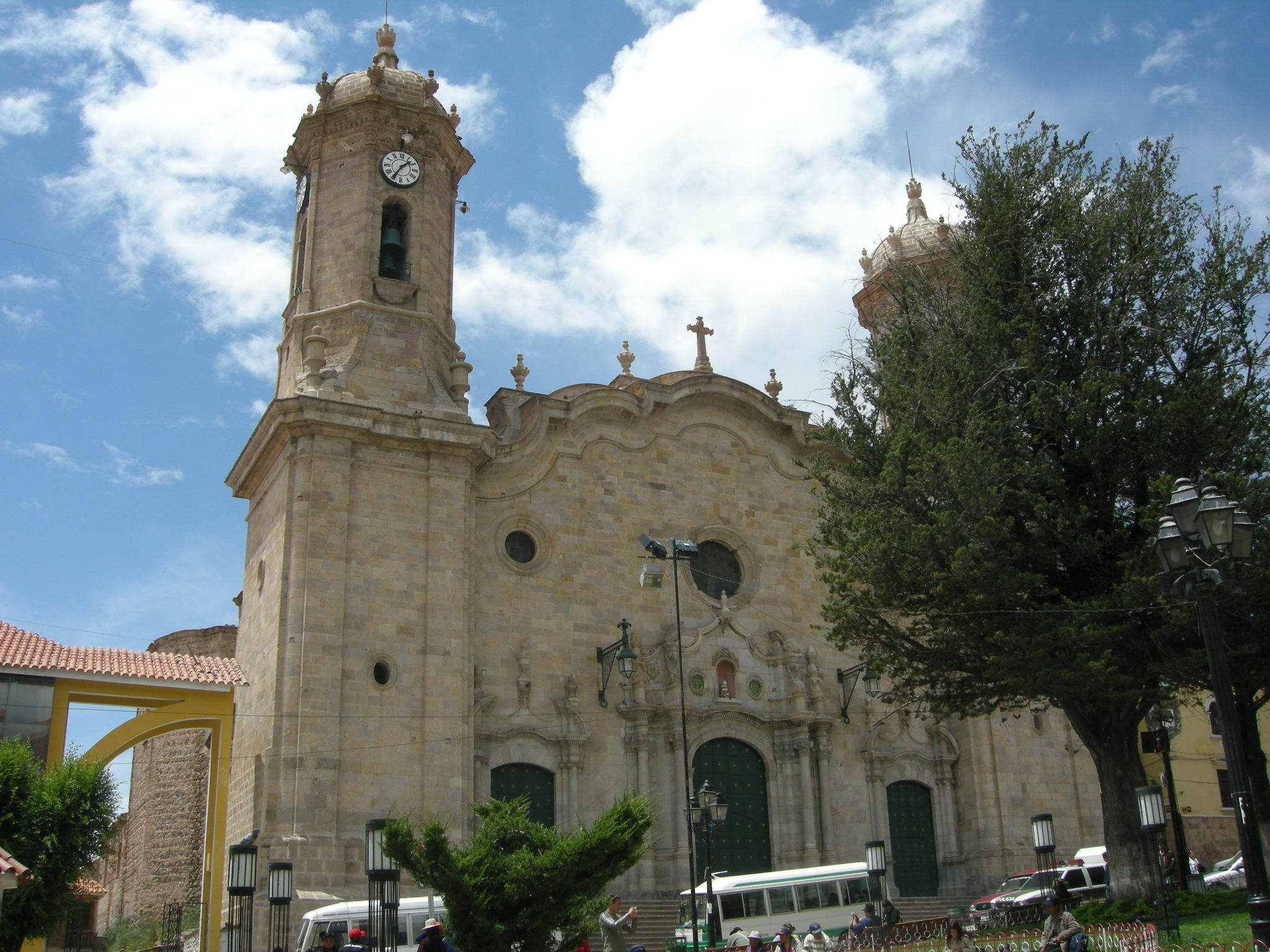
- Cathedral Basilica of Our Lady of Peace

Location
- Country: Bolivia
- Ecclesiastical province: Sucre
- Metropolitan: Sucre
- Headquarters: Potosí, Potosí Department, Bolivia

Statistics
- Area: 18,218 km^{2} (7,034 sq mi)
- Population: Total; Catholics: (as of 2023); 870,000; 772,000 (88.7%)
- Parishes: 50

Information
- Denomination: Catholic Church
- Sui iuris church: Latin Church
- Rite: Roman Rite
- Established: 11 November 1924; 102 years ago
- Cathedral: Cathedral Basilica of Our Lady of Peace in Potosí
- Patron saint: Saint John Vianney
- Secular priests: 58 (49 Diocesan, 9 Religious Orders)

Current leadership
- Pope: Leo XIV
- Bishop: Nicolás Renán Aguilera Arroyo
- Metropolitan Archbishop: Nicolás Renán Aguilera Arroyo (as Apostolic Administrator of Sucre)

Map

The Roman Catholic Diocese of Potosí (Latin: Dioecesis Potosiensis in Bolivia) is a diocese located in the city of Potosí in the ecclesiastical province of Sucre in Bolivia.

== History ==
- 11 November 1924: Established as Diocese of Potosí from the Metropolitan Archdiocese of La Plata

== Leadership ==
=== Bishops of Potosí ===
- Cleto Loayza Gumiel (13 November 1924 – 30 December 1968)
- Bernardo Fey Schneider, C.Ss.R. (30 December 1968 – 21 May 1983), resigned
- Edmundo Luis Flavio Abastoflor Montero (6 October 1984 – 31 July 1996), appointed Archbishop of La Paz
- Walter Pérez Villamonte (7 March 1998 – 25 November 2009), resigned
- Ricardo Centellas (25 November 2009 – 11 February 2020), appointed Archbishop of Sucre
- Nicolás Renán Aguilera Arroyo (28 October 2020 – Present)

=== Coadjutor bishop ===
- Bernardo Fey Schneider, C.Ss.R. (1956-1968), succeeded

=== Auxiliary bishops ===
- Bernardo Fey Schneider, C.Ss.R. (1952-1956), appointed Coadjutor bishop here
- Bernardino Rivera Álvarez, O.F.M. (1976-2000), retired
- Toribio Ticona Porco (1986-1992), appointed Prelate of Corocoro
- Ricardo Centellas (2005-2009), appointed Bishop here

== See also ==
- Roman Catholicism in Bolivia
