= Joseph Frans Lescrauwaet =

The Most Reverend Joseph Frans Lescrauwaet, M.S.C.
- Titular bishop of Turres Concordiae
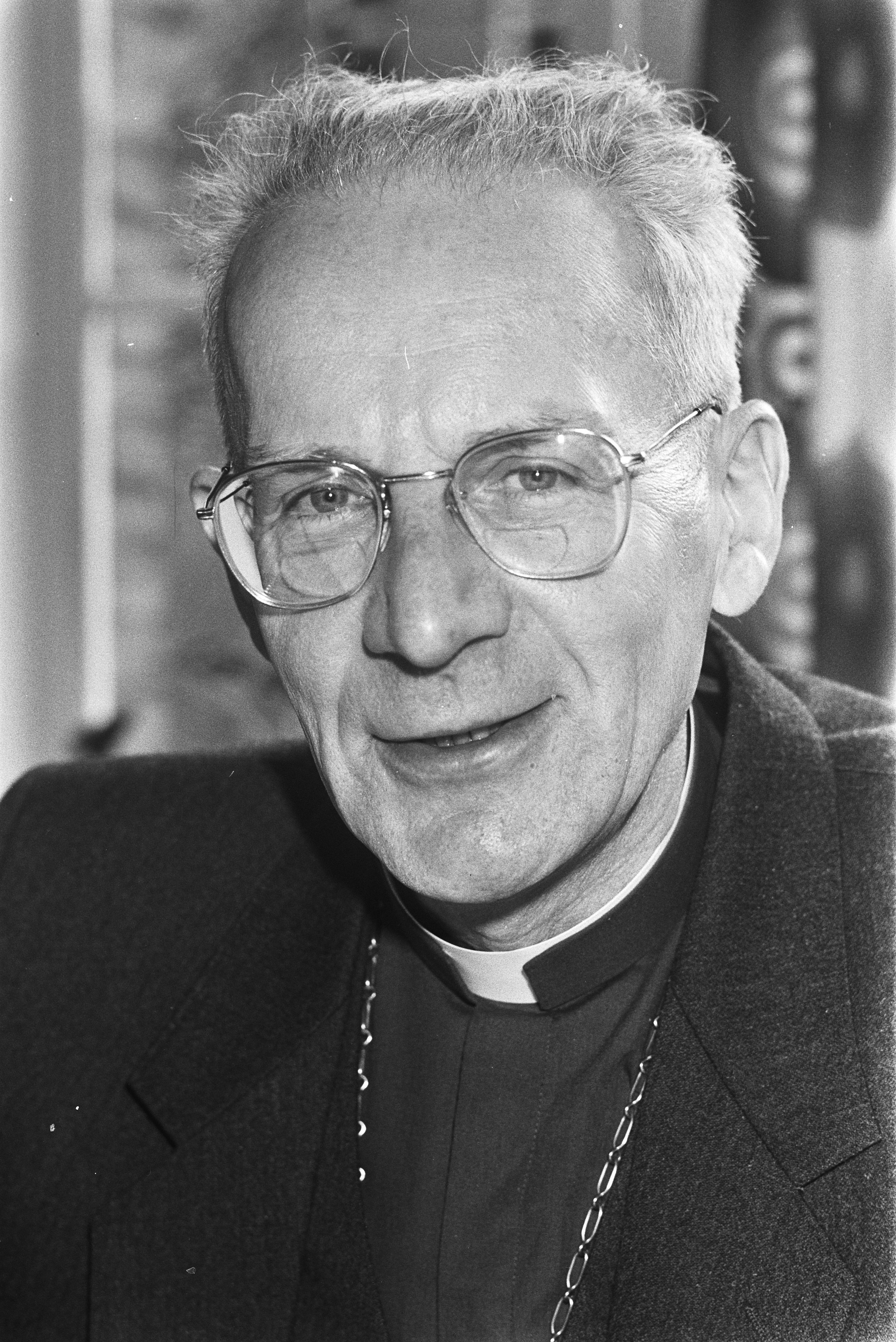
- Church: Roman Catholic Church
- Archdiocese: Roman Catholic Archdiocese of Utrecht
- Diocese: Roman Catholic Diocese of Haarlem-Amsterdam
- See: Titular See of Turres Concordiae
- In office: 1983 - 2013
- Predecessor: André Bernard Michel Quélen
- Successor: Salvatore Angerami

Orders
- Ordination: September 12, 1948
- Consecration: January 14, 1984 by Henricus Bomers, C.M., Hubertus Ernst, Johannes Antonius de Kok

Personal details
- Born: 19 June 1923 Amsterdam, Netherlands
- Died: 19 November 2013 (aged 90) Tilburg, Netherlands
- Buried: Orthen, Netherlands
- Motto: Redite ad Cor (Return to the Heart)

Joseph Frans Lescrauwaet, M.S.C. (19 June 1923 – 19 November 2013) was a Dutch prelate of the Catholic Church.

Lescrauwaet was born in Amsterdam, Netherlands and was ordained a priest on 12 September 1948 from religious order of Missionaries of the Sacred Heart of Jesus. Lescrauwaet was appointed auxiliary bishop of Diocese of Haarlem on 19 October 1983 as well as Titular Bishop of Turres Concordiae and was ordained bishop on 14 January 1984. Lescrauwaet resigned as auxiliary bishop of Haarlem on 22 March 1995.
