= Juan de la Plaza =

Juan de la Plaza (1527–1602) was a Jesuit missionary to New Spain.

== Biography ==
Plaza was born in 1527. He received a doctorate in theology from the University of Alcalá, and subsequently served in the Jesuit administration in Spain and Italy.

In August 1573, Plaza and fellow Jesuit Diego de Bracamonte met with Juan de Ovando y Godoy, president of the Council of the Indies, to discuss the Jesuit missions in Peru. In letters to his superiors, Plaza expressed doubts about the legitimacy of the Spanish dominion over Peru, questioning the morality of Jesuit involvement in the conquest and colonization.

Everard Mercurian assigned Plaza as plenipotentiary visitor in Peru. Plaza embarked for Peru on 19 October 1574, arriving in Lima on 31 May 1575.

In 1576, Plaza and a group of companions traveled to the doctrina of Juli. Plaza praised the mission in his report, writing that the burden on the natives of supporting the priests was ameliorated by a royal stipend, and that the priests did not have to administer corporal punishment to the natives, instead delegating it to a vicar and corregidor.

From 1580 to 1585, Plaza was provincial superior in Mexico. He served as rector of the Jesuit college in Tepotzotlán, and attended the Third Mexican Council in 1585.

Plaza died in 1602.
