= Fiera della Frecagnola =

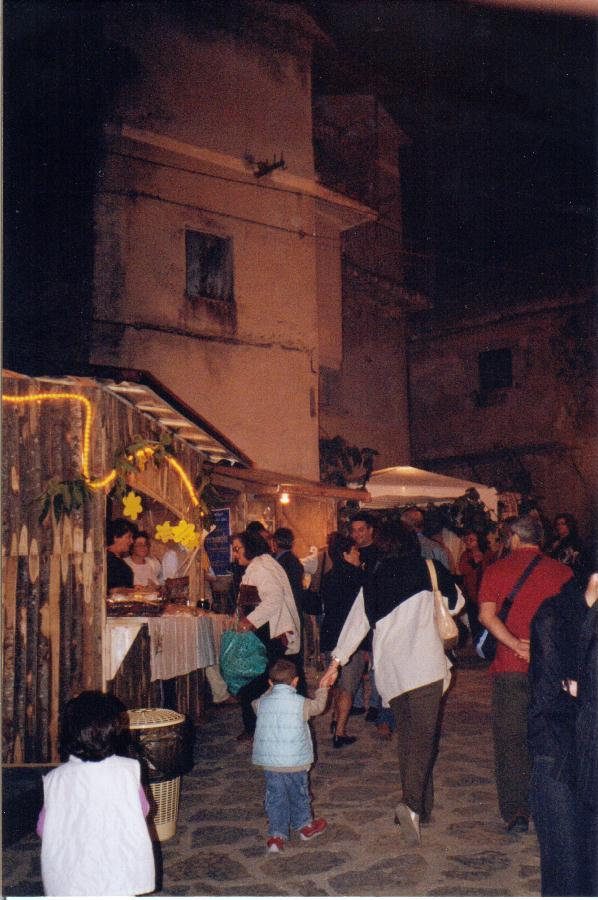
Shop in Fiera della Frecagnola.

Fiera della Frecagnola (Frecagnola Festival) is a festival which is celebrated every fall in the southern Italian mountain village of Cannalonga

The festival is an old tradition that can be traced back to c. 1450, then known as Fiera di Santa Lucia. However, it has been suggested that while the festival was first attested in 1452, it predates this possibly by centuries.

The festival takes place over 5 days and draws as many as 50,000 visitors.
