= Bernardino Rivera Álvarez =

Bernardino Rivera Alvarez
- Born: January 31, 1925
- Died: July 12, 2010
- Occupation: Bishop
- Known for: Roman Catholic titular bishop of Mutagenna, auxiliary bishop of the Roman Catholic Diocese of Potosi, Bolivia.

Bernardino Rivera Alvarez (January 31, 1925 – July 12, 2010) was the Roman Catholic titular bishop of Mutagenna and auxiliary bishop of the Roman Catholic Diocese of Potosi, Bolivia.

Ordained to the priesthood on December 20, 1952, Rivera Alvarez was appointed auxiliary bishop of the Potosi Diocese on November 22, 1976, and was ordained bishop on January 16, 1977, retiring on April 25, 2000.
