= Pedro Moya de Contreras =

Roman Catholic Archbishop of Mexico (1528–1591)

The Most Reverend Pedro Moya de Contreras
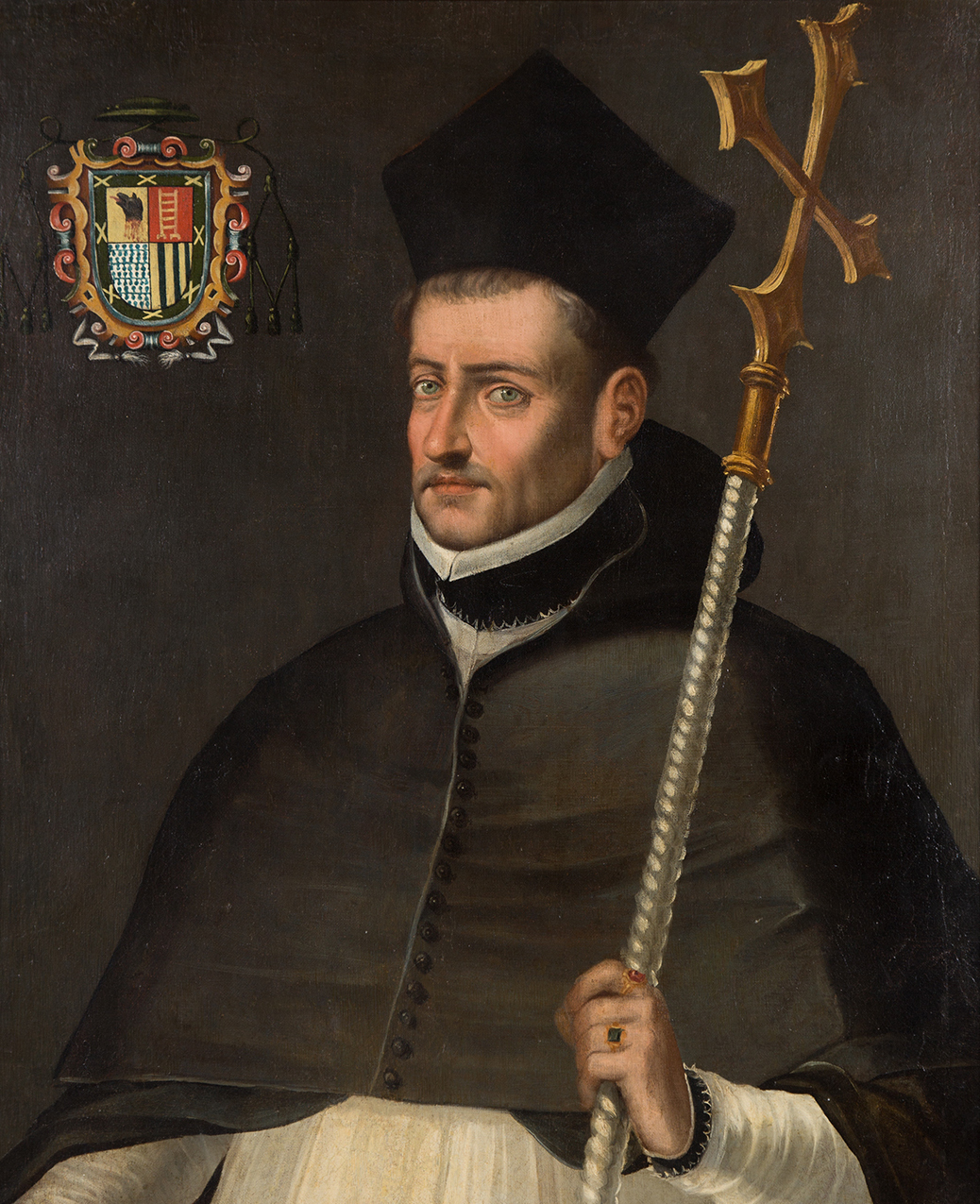

Viceroy of New Spain
- In office September 25, 1584 – October 17, 1585
- Monarch: Philip II of Spain
- Preceded by: Luis de Villanueva y Zapata
- Succeeded by: Álvaro Manrique de Zúñiga

President of Council of the Indies
- In office 1585 – December 21, 1591
- Archbishop of Mexico
- Archdiocese: Mexico
- Installed: June 17, 1573
- Term ended: December 7, 1591
- Predecessor: Alonso de Montúfar
- Successor: Alonso Fernández de Bonilla

Orders
- Ordination: November 21, 1573
- Consecration: by Antonio Ruíz de Morales y Molina

Personal details
- Born: c. 1527 Pedroche, Córdoba, Spain
- Died: December 21, 1591 (aged 63–64) Madrid, Spain
- Denomination: Roman Catholic

Pedro Moya de Contreras (sometimes Pedro de Moya y Contreras) (c. 1528, Pedroche, Córdoba Province, Spain – December 21, 1591, Madrid) was a prelate and colonial administrator who held the three highest offices in the Spanish colony of New Spain, namely inquisitor general, Archbishop of Mexico, and Viceroy of Mexico, September 25, 1584 – October 17, 1585. He was the 6th Viceroy, governing from September 25, 1584, to October 16, 1585. During this interval he held all three positions.

== Ecclesiastical career ==
Moya de Contreras received the degree of doctor of canon law from the University of Salamanca. Later he became head of the cathedral school in the Canary Islands, and then inquisitor of Murcia.

In 1571 he became the first inquisitor general of New Spain (and thus the first inquisitor general in the New World). He established the Tribunal del Santo Oficio in Mexico City in 1571. As inquisitor general he required people of New Spain, from the oidores (members of the Audiencia), nobles and religious to the most humble members of society, to solemnly swear to defend the Catholic faith and persecute heretics "as rabid dogs and wolves, infectors of spirits and destroyers of the vineyard of Our Lord." He celebrated the first auto-da-fé in New Spain in 1571.

Two years later, on June 15, 1573, Moya de Contreras was chosen Archbishop of Mexico and consecrated bishop on November 21, 1573, by Antonio Ruíz de Morales y Molina, Bishop of Tlaxcala (Puebla de los Angeles). He served until 1591, the year of his death. In 1585 he convoked and presided at the Third Provincial Council of the Church in Mexico, which established standards for the Church that endured to the end of the colonial era. This council banned the enslavement of the Indians. As both archbishop and viceroy, one of his major concerns was education of the Indians. He founded the Seminary of the Indies, to teach them Christian doctrine, reading, writing, singing and trades.

While bishop, he was the principal consecrator of Juan de Medina Rincón y de la Vega, Bishop of Michoacán (1574); Francisco Gómez de Mendiola y Solórzano, Bishop of Guadalajara (1574); and Alfonso Graniero Avalos, Bishop of La Plata o Charcas (1579).

== Political career ==
In 1583 Moya de Contreras's predecessor as viceroy, Lorenzo Suárez de Mendoza, 4th conde de la Coruña, asked King Philip II to name a special visitador (royal inspector) to help resolve a conflict between the viceroy and the Audiencia. Philip named Moya, then the sitting Archbishop of Mexico. As visitador, he took up the accusations against the corrupt oidores and other officials of the viceroyalty. He dismissed the former and punished the latter, some by hanging. In a letter reporting to the king, he praised those officials who had honestly met their obligations, and castigated others.

Suárez de Mendoza died in June, 1583. The Audiencia was formally in charge of the colony for 16 months, until the installation of the new viceroy. However, Moya de Contreras continued in the position of visitador during the interregnum, with much influence. In 1584, he was named viceroy to succeed Suárez.

He took up the new position on September 25, 1584. He now held the three most important positions in the colony. With this concentration of power, he was able to remedy many of the prevalent abuses, with immediate punishment for those found to be transgressors of the law or of decency. This resulted in much enmity among the governing class, but the lower classes proclaimed him as their defender. He was able to increase rents and payments to Spain considerably.

In 1585 he resigned as viceroy, but retained his other positions (including visitador) for a little longer while he wound up his affairs before returning to Spain. Upon his return, he became president of the Council of the Indies, a position he held until his death.

Moya de Contreras died in Spain in December, 1591, so poor that the Crown paid for his funeral. His body was interred in the parish church of Santiago, in Madrid. He left various writings which were collected in the book Cartas de Indias, published in Madrid in 1877.

== See also ==
- Luis de Villanueva y Zapata, interim viceroy who preceded Moya de Contreras

Religious titles
Preceded by Alonso de Montúfar	Archbishop of Mexico; 1573–1591	Succeeded by Alonso Fernández de Bonilla
Preceded by Antonio de Fonseca	Patriarch of the West Indies; 1591 (never installed)	Succeeded by Juan Guzmán
Government offices
Preceded by Lorenzo Suárez de Mendoza	Viceroy of New Spain; 1584–1585	Succeeded by Álvaro Manrique de Zúñiga
