= Alonso Ramírez Vergara =

Peruvian Roman Catholic prelate

Most Reverend Alonso Ramírez Vergara
- Bishop of La Plata o Charcas
- Church: Catholic Church
- In office: 1594–1602
- Predecessor: Alfonso de la Cerda (bishop)
- Successor: Luis López de Solís

Orders
- Consecration: 17 June 1594 by Toribio Alfonso de Mogrovejo

Personal details
- Died: 19 November 1602 Sucre, Peru

Alonso Ramírez Vergara, O.S. (died 19 November 1602) was a Roman Catholic prelate who served as Bishop of La Plata o Charcas (1594–1602).

== Biography ==
Alonso Ramírez Vergara was ordained a priest in the Order of Santiago. On 17 June 1594, he was appointed during the papacy of Pope Clement VIII as Bishop of La Plata o Charcas. In 1595, he was consecrated bishop by Toribio Alfonso de Mogrovejo, Archbishop of Lima. He served as Bishop of La Plata o Charcas until his death on 19 November 1602.

== External links and additional sources ==
- Cheney, David M. "Archdiocese of Sucre". Catholic-Hierarchy.org. (for Chronology of Bishops) ^{[self-published]}
- Chow, Gabriel. "Metropolitan Archdiocese of Sucre (Bolivia)". GCatholic.org. (for Chronology of Bishops) ^{[self-published]}

Catholic Church titles
Preceded by Alfonso de la Cerda (bishop)	Bishop of La Plata o Charcas; 1594–1602	Succeeded by Luis López de Solís
