= Diego de Romano y Govea =

Spanish bishop

Most Reverend Diego de Romano y Govea
- Bishop of Tlaxcala
- Church: Catholic Church
- Diocese: Diocese of Tlaxcala.
- In office: 1578–1606
- Predecessor: Antonio Ruíz de Morales y Molina
- Successor: Alfonso de la Mota y Escobar

Personal details
- Born: 1538 Valladolid, Spain
- Died: April 12, 1606 (age 68) Puebla de los Angeles, Mexico

Diego de Romano y Govea (1538 – 12 April 1606) served as Bishop of Tlaxcala (1578–1606).

== Biography ==
Diego de Romano y Govea was born in Valladolid, Spain. On January 13, 1578, Pope Gregory XIII appointed him as Bishop of Tlaxcala, and he was accordingly installed on December 2, 1578. In 1585, he attended the Third Mexican Provincial Council.

He served as Bishop of Tlaxcala until his death on 12 April 1606.

== Episcopal succession ==
While bishop, he was the principal consecrator of:

- Bartolomé de Ledesma, Bishop of Panamá;
- Francisco Santos García de Ontiveros y Martínez, Bishop of Guadalajara;
- Ignacio Santibáñez, Archbishop of Manila;
- Pedro de Agurto, Bishop of Cebu;
- Bartolomé Lobo Guerrero, Archbishop of Santafé en Nueva Granada;
- Baltazar de Cobarrubias y Múñoz, Bishop of Paraguay;

and the principal co-consecrator of:

- Alfonso Graniero Avalos, Bishop of La Plata o Charcas.

== External links and additional sources ==
- Cheney, David M. "Archdiocese of Puebla de los Ángeles, Puebla". Catholic-Hierarchy.org. (for Chronology of Bishops) ^{[self-published]}
- Chow, Gabriel. "Metropolitan Archdiocese of Puebla de los Ángeles (Mexico)". GCatholic.org. (for Chronology of Bishops) ^{[self-published]}

Catholic Church titles
Preceded by Antonio Ruíz de Morales y Molina	Bishop of Tlaxcala; 1578–1606	Succeeded by Alfonso de la Mota y Escobar
