= Alfonso Graniero Avalos =

Most Reverend Alfonso Graniero Avalos
- Bishop of La Plata o Charcas
- Church: Catholic Church
- Diocese: Diocese of La Plata o Charcas
- In office: 1579–1585
- Predecessor: Fernando Santillana Figueroa
- Successor: Alfonso de la Cerda (bishop)

Personal details
- Died: 1585

Alfonso Graniero Avalos (died 1585) was a Roman Catholic prelate who served as Bishop of La Plata o Charcas (1579–1585).

== Biography ==
On 9 January 1579, Alfonso Graniero Avalos was appointed Bishop of La Plata o Charcas during the papacy of Pope Gregory XIII. In 1579, he was consecrated bishop by Pedro de Moya y Contreras, Archbishop of México, with Juan de Medina Rincón y de la Vega, Bishop of Michoacán, and Diego de Romano y Govea, Bishop of Tlaxcala, serving as co-consecrators. He served as Bishop of La Plata o Charcas until his death in 1585.

== External links and additional sources ==
- Cheney, David M. "Archdiocese of Sucre". Catholic-Hierarchy.org. (for Chronology of Bishops) ^{[self-published]}
- Chow, Gabriel. "Metropolitan Archdiocese of Sucre (Bolivia)". GCatholic.org. (for Chronology of Bishops) ^{[self-published]}

Catholic Church titles
Preceded by Fernando Santillana Figueroa	Bishop of La Plata o Charcas; 1579–1585	Succeeded by Alfonso de la Cerda (bishop)
