= Pedro de la Torre =

Most Reverend Pedro de la Torre
- Bishop of Paraguay
- Church: Catholic Church
- Diocese: Diocese of Paraguay
- In office: 1554–1573
- Predecessor: Juan de los Barrios
- Successor: Alfonso Guerra (bishop)

Personal details
- Died: 1573 Asunción, Paraguay

Pedro de la Torre (died 1573) was a Roman Catholic prelate who served as Bishop of Paraguay (1554–1573).

== Biography ==
Pedro de la Torre was ordained a priest in the Order of Friars Minor. On 27 August 1554, he was appointed during the papacy of Pope Julius III as Bishop of Paraguay. He served as Bishop of Paraguay until his death in 1573.

== External links and additional sources ==
- Cheney, David M. "Archdiocese of Asunción". Catholic-Hierarchy.org. (for Chronology of Bishops) ^{[self-published]}
- Chow, Gabriel. "Metropolitan Archdiocese of Asunción (Paraguay)". GCatholic.org. (for Chronology of Bishops) ^{[self-published]}

Catholic Church titles
Preceded by Juan de los Barrios	Bishop of Paraguay; 1554–1573	Succeeded by Alfonso Guerra (bishop)
