= Apostolic Vicariate of Ñuflo de Chávez =

Catholic missionary jurisdiction in Bolivia

Apostolic Vicariate of Ñuflo de Chávez Apostolicus Vicariatus Niuflensis Vicariato Apostólico de Ñuflo de Chávez
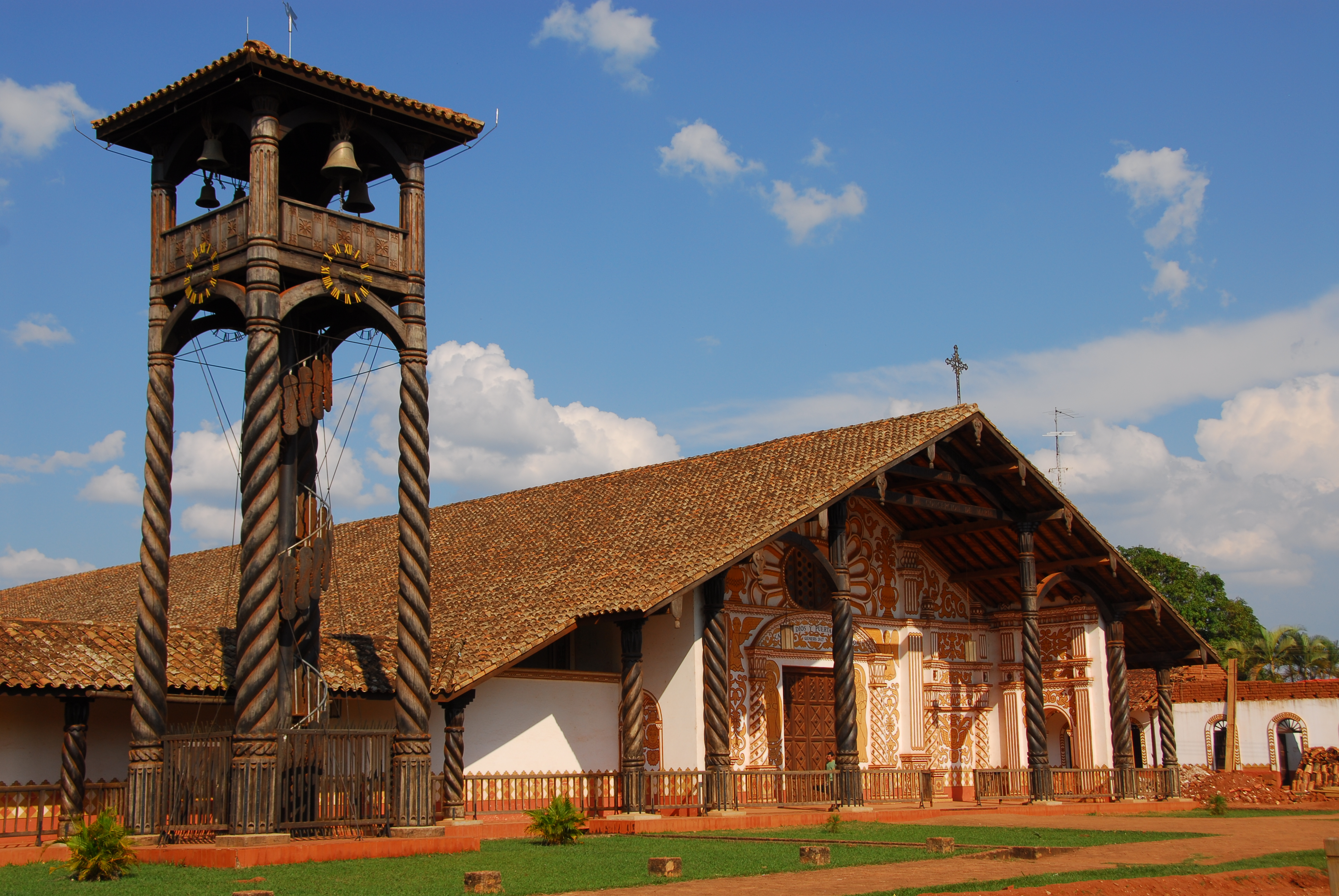
- Cathedral of the Immaculate Conception

Location
- Country: Bolivia
- Metropolitan: Immediately subject to the Holy See

Statistics
- Area: 81,493 km^{2} (31,465 sq mi)
- Population: Total; Catholics: (as of 2010); 180,000; 152,000 (84.4%)
- Parishes: 17

Information
- Denomination: Catholic Church
- Sui iuris church: Latin Church
- Rite: Roman Rite
- Established: 13 December 1951 (74 years ago)
- Cathedral: Cathedral of the Immaculate Conception in Concepción

Current leadership
- Pope: Leo XIV
- Apostolic Vicar: Bonifacio Antonio Reimann Panic, O.F.M.

Map

Website
- Website of the Vicarate

The Vicariate Apostolic of Ñuflo de Chávez (Latin: Apostolicus Vicariatus Niuflensis) is a Latin Church missionary ecclesiastical territory or apostolic vicariate of the Catholic Church in Bolivia. It is immediately exempt to the Holy See. Its cathedra is located in the episcopal see of Concepción, Santa Cruz.

== History ==
On 13 December 1951 Pope Pius XII established the Vicariate Apostolic of Ñuflo de Chávez from the Vicariate Apostolic of Chiquitos.

== Leadership ==
- Jorge Kilian (Chiliano) Pflaum, O.F.M. † (16 November 1953 – 18 September 1971)
- Antonio Eduardo Bösl, O.F.M. † (18 December 1972 – 13 October 2000)
- Bonifacio Antonio Reimann Panic, O.F.M. (31 October 2001 – Present)

== See also ==
- Roman Catholicism in Bolivia
