= Alonso de Peralta =

Most Reverend Alonso de Peralta
- Archbishop of La Plata o Charcas
- Church: Catholic Church
- Archdiocese: Roman Catholic Archdiocese of Sucre
- In office: 1609–1614
- Predecessor: Diego de Zambrana
- Successor: Jerónimo Tiedra Méndez

Orders
- Consecration: 30 Nov 1609 by Francisco García Guerra

Personal details
- Died: 3 December 1614

Alonso de Peralta (died 1614) was a Roman Catholic prelate who served as Archbishop of La Plata o Charcas (1609–1614).

== Biography ==
On 14 Jan 1609, Alonso de Peralta was appointed during the papacy of Pope Paul V as Archbishop of La Plata o Charcas. On 30 Nov 1609, he was consecrated bishop by Francisco García Guerra, Archbishop of México, with Diego Vázquez de Mercado, Archbishop of Manila, serving as co-consecrators. He served as Archbishop of La Plata o Charcas until his death on 3 Dec 1614.

== External links and additional sources ==
- Cheney, David M. "Archdiocese of Sucre". Catholic-Hierarchy.org. (for Chronology of Bishops) ^{[self-published]}
- Chow, Gabriel. "Metropolitan Archdiocese of Sucre (Bolivia)". GCatholic.org. (for Chronology of Bishops) ^{[self-published]}

Catholic Church titles
Preceded by Diego de Zambrana	Archbishop of La Plata o Charcas; 1609–1614	Succeeded by Jerónimo Tiedra Méndez
