= Fernando Santillana Figueroa =

Most Reverend Fernando Santillana Figueroa
- Bishop-Elect of La Plata o Charcas
- Church: Catholic Church
- Diocese: Diocese of La Plata o Charcas
- In office: 1572–1574
- Predecessor: Domingo de Santo Tomás
- Successor: Alfonso Graniero Avalos

Personal details
- Died: 1574

Fernando Santillana Figueroa (died 1574) was a Roman Catholic prelate who served as Bishop-Elect of La Plata o Charcas (1572–1574).

== Biography ==
On 17 October 1572, Fernando Santillana Figueroa was appointed during the papacy of Pope Gregory XIII as Bishop of La Plata o Charcas. He died before his consecration as Bishop-Elect of La Plata o Charcas in 1574.

== External links and additional sources ==
- Cheney, David M. "Archdiocese of Sucre". Catholic-Hierarchy.org. (for Chronology of Bishops) ^{[self-published]}
- Chow, Gabriel. "Metropolitan Archdiocese of Sucre (Bolivia)". GCatholic.org. (for Chronology of Bishops) ^{[self-published]}

Catholic Church titles
Preceded by Domingo de Santo Tomás	Bishop-Elect of La Plata o Charcas; 1572–1574	Succeeded by Alfonso Graniero Avalos
