= Antonio Ruíz de Morales y Molina =

Roman Catholic bishop

Most Reverend Antonio Ruíz de Morales y Molina
- Bishop of Tlaxcala
- Church: Catholic Church
- Diocese: Diocese of Tlaxcala
- In office: 1572–1576
- Predecessor: Fernando de Villagómez
- Successor: Diego de Romano y Govea

Personal details
- Born: Córdoba, Spain
- Died: 17 July 1576 Puebla, Mexico

Antonio Ruíz de Morales y Molina, O.S. (died 1576) was a Roman Catholic prelate who served as Bishop of Tlaxcala (1572–1576) and Bishop of Michoacán (1566–1572).

== Biography ==
Antonio Ruíz de Morales y Molina was born in Córdoba, Spain and ordained a priest in the Order of Santiago. On 15 May 1566, he was appointed during the papacy of Pope Pius V as Bishop of Michoacán. On 10 December 1572, he was appointed during the papacy of Pope Gregory XIII as Bishop of Tlaxcala and installed on 8 October 1573. He served as Bishop of Tlaxcala until his death on 17 July 1576. While bishop, he was the principal consecrator of Pedro de Moya y Contreras, Archbishop of México (1573); and the principal co-consecrator of Juan de Medina Rincón y de la Vega, Bishop of Michoacán (1574).

== External links and additional sources ==
- Cheney, David M. "Archdiocese of Morelia". Catholic-Hierarchy.org. (for Chronology of Bishops) ^{[self-published]}
- Chow, Gabriel. "Metropolitan Archdiocese of Morelia (Mexico)". GCatholic.org. (for Chronology of Bishops) ^{[self-published]}
- Cheney, David M. "Archdiocese of Puebla de los Ángeles, Puebla". Catholic-Hierarchy.org. (for Chronology of Bishops) ^{[self-published]}
- Chow, Gabriel. "Metropolitan Archdiocese of Puebla de los Ángeles (Mexico)". GCatholic.org. (for Chronology of Bishops) ^{[self-published]}

Catholic Church titles
Preceded by Vasco de Quiroga	Bishop of Michoacán; 1566–1572	Succeeded by Juan de Medina Rincón y de la Vega
Preceded by Fernando de Villagómez	Bishop of Tlaxcala; 1572–1576	Succeeded by Diego de Romano y Govea
