= Alfonso Guerra (bishop) =

Spanish Roman Catholic prelate (1596)

The Most Reverend Alfonso Guerra
- Bishop of Michoacán
- Church: Catholic Church
- Diocese: Diocese of Michoacán
- In office: 1592–1596
- Predecessor: Juan de Medina Rincón y de la Vega
- Successor: Domingo de Ulloa
- Previous post: Bishop of Paraguay (1579–1592)

Orders
- Consecration: 9 March 1592 by Toribio Alfonso de Mogrovejo

Personal details
- Born: Valladolid, Spain
- Died: 18 June 1596 Valladolid, Spain

Alfonso Guerra OP (died 18 June 1596) was a Roman Catholic prelate who served as Bishop of Michoacán (1592–1596) and Bishop of Paraguay (1579–1592).

== Biography ==
Alfonso Guerra was born in Valladolid, Spain and ordained a priest in the Order of Preachers. On 6 February 1579, he was appointed during the papacy of Pope Gregory XIII as Bishop of Paraguay. On 9 March 1592, he was consecrated bishop by Toribio Alfonso de Mogrovejo, Archbishop of Lima, with Antonio Avendaño y Paz, Bishop of Concepción; Sebastián Lartaún, Bishop of Cuzco; and Diego de Medellin, Bishop of Santiago de Chile, serving as co-consecrators. On 9 March 1592, he was appointed during the papacy of Pope Clement VIII as Bishop of Michoacán. He served in that role until his death on 18 June 1596 in Valladolid.

== External links and additional sources ==
- Cheney, David M. "Archdiocese of Asunción". Catholic-Hierarchy.org. (for Chronology of Bishops) ^{[self-published]}
- Chow, Gabriel. "Metropolitan Archdiocese of Asunción (Paraguay)". GCatholic.org. (for Chronology of Bishops) ^{[self-published]}
- Cheney, David M. "Archdiocese of Morelia". Catholic-Hierarchy.org. (for Chronology of Bishops) ^{[self-published]}
- Chow, Gabriel. "Metropolitan Archdiocese of Morelia (Mexico)". GCatholic.org. (for Chronology of Bishops) ^{[self-published]}

Catholic Church titles
Preceded by Pedro de la Torre	Bishop of Paraguay; 1579–1592	Succeeded by Thomas Vásquez de Liaño
Preceded by Juan de Medina Rincón y de la Vega	Bishop of Michoacán; 1592–1596	Succeeded by Domingo de Ulloa
