= Luis López de Solís =

Spanish Roman Catholic prelate (1534–1606)

Most Reverend Luis López de Solís
- Bishop of La Plata o Charcas
- Church: Catholic Church
- Archdiocese: Archdiocese of La Plata o Charcas
- In office: 1605–1606
- Predecessor: Alonso Ramírez Vergara
- Successor: Diego de Zambrana
- Previous post: Bishop of Quito (1592–1605)

Orders
- Ordination: 1558
- Consecration: April 3, 1594 by Toribio Alfonso de Mogrovejo

Personal details
- Born: 1534 Salamanca, Spain
- Died: July 5, 1606 (age 72)

Luis López de Solís, O.S.A. (1534 – July 5, 1606) was a Roman Catholic prelate who served as the Bishop of La Plata o Charcas (1605–1606) and the Bishop of Quito (1592–1605).

== Biography ==
Luis López de Solís was born in Salamanca, Spain and ordained a priest in the Order of Saint Augustine in 1558. On September 7, 1592, he was appointed by the King of Spain and confirmed by Pope Clement VIII as Bishop of Quito. On April 3, 1594, he was consecrated bishop by Toribio Alfonso de Mogrovejo, Archbishop of Lima. On July 18, 1605, he was appointed by the King of Spain and confirmed by Pope Clement VIII as Bishop of La Plata o Charcas. He served as Bishop of La Plata o Charcas until his death on July 5, 1606.

While bishop, he was the principal consecrator of Fernando Trexo y Senabria, Bishop of Córdoba.

== External links and additional sources ==
- Chow, Gabriel. "Metropolitan Archdiocese of Concepción (Chile)". GCatholic.org. (for Chronology of Bishops) ^{[self-published]}
- Cheney, David M. "Archdiocese of Quito". Catholic-Hierarchy.org. (for Chronology of Bishops) ^{[self-published]}
- Cheney, David M. "Archdiocese of Sucre". Catholic-Hierarchy.org. (for Chronology of Bishops) ^{[self-published]}
- Chow, Gabriel. "Metropolitan Archdiocese of Sucre (Bolivia)". GCatholic.org. (for Chronology of Bishops) ^{[self-published]}

Religious titles
Preceded by Antonio Avendaño y Paz	Bishop of Quito; 1592–1605	Succeeded by Salvador Ribera Avalos
Preceded by Alonso Ramírez Vergara	Bishop of La Plata o Charcas; 1605–1606	Succeeded by Diego de Zambrana
