= Korba, Tunisia =

Korba قربة
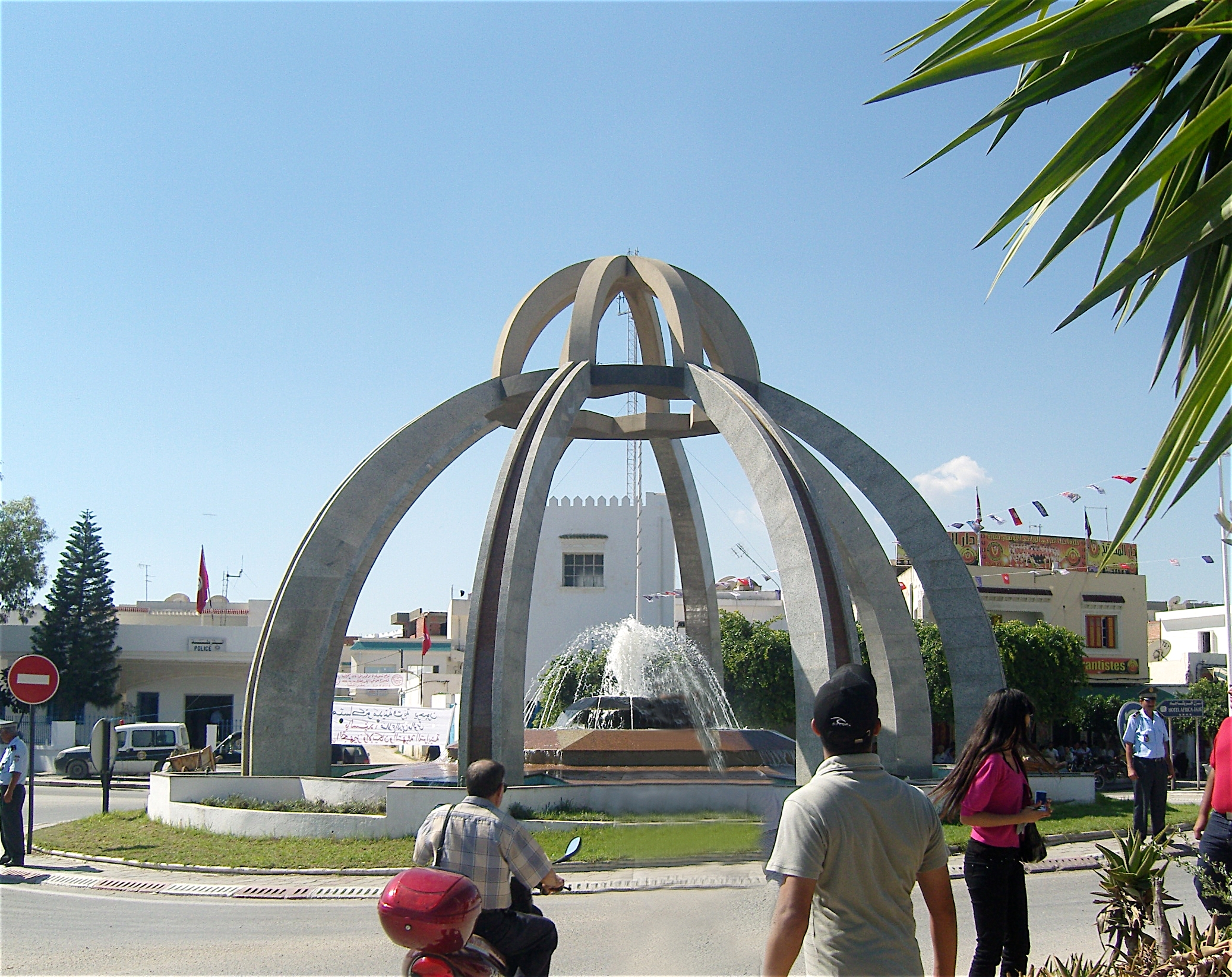
- Korba, Tunisia

- Location in Tunisia
- Coordinates: 36°34′N 10°52′E
- Country: Tunisia
- Governorate: Nabeul Governorate

Population (2022)
  - Total: 65,542
- Time zone: UTC1 (CET)

Korba (Tunisian Arabic: قربة qorbā), ancient Curubis, is a town in Tunisia on the eastern shore of the Cap Bon. It was the place of exile of the Carthaginian bishop Cyprian in the year leading up to his martyrdom. Modern Korba is in the Nabeul Governorate and had a population of 48,314 in 2014.

== History ==
Ancient geographers and itineraries mention the town Curubis on the African coast between Clupea (modern Kelibia) and Neapolis (modern Nabeul).

The earliest historical record is an inscription from the time of the Roman civil war, which records that the Pompeian generals P. Attius Varus and Gaius Considius Longus fortified the town in 48—47 BC. In the years after the civil war the town was made a Roman colony, colonia Iulia Curubis (Pliny the Elder refers to it as libera, "free"), perhaps as part of Julius Caesar's attempt to rid his army of older soldiers and at the same time hold Africa against Pompeian forces. In the year AD 257, the Carthaginian bishop Cyprian was exiled there; his biographer Pontius, who accompanied him into exile, praises the place (12): "provisum esse divinitus … apricum et conpetentem locum, hospitium pro voluntate secretum et quidquid apponi eis ante promissum est, qui regnum et iustitiam dei quaerunt." ("by God's favour a sunny and appropriate place was provided, a refuge secluded as he wished, and whatever was previously promised to be set before those who seek the kingdom and justice of God").

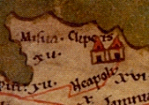
Cape Bon as shown on the 4th century Roman Map, Tabula Peutingeriana.

The town had its own theatre. An inscription of the late 2nd century honours the citizen who had created it. Remains of an aqueduct survived to modern times; and the contribution to a mosaic in Ostia by shipowners of Curubis suggest that the town also possessed a port, which has not survived.

A recent account of the life in Korba may be found in Mounira Khemir's narrative "Un coin du carré bleu"

=== Ecclesiastical history ===
By the year 411, Curubis, like many African towns, had its own bishop. The bishopric survived through the Arian Vandal and Orthodox Byzantine empires, only ceasing to function with the Muslim conquest of the Maghreb.

The cathedra of the bishopric was based in the civitas of Curubis.

==== Bishops ====
- In the year AD 257, the Carthaginian bishop Cyprian was exiled there.
- In 411 the Donatist Victor took part in the joint Conference of Carthage (411) between Catholic and Donatist bishops.
- In 484 Felix attended the Council called by the Arian king Huneric and was then exiled to Corsica.
- Peregrinus was at the Council of Carthage (525).
- Bennatus signed a condemnation of Monothelitism at the Council of Carthage (646).

==== Titular see ====
The diocese was refounded as a titular see of the Roman Catholic Church in the 1930s.

The titular bishops are:

- Paul-Marie Dumond (27 Apr 1912—19 Feb 1944);
- Joseph-Paul Strebler (8 Nov 1945—14 Sep 1955);
- Rafael Valladares y Argumedo (18 Aug 1956—31 Aug 1961);
- Paul Grégoire (26 Oct 1961—20 Apr 1968);
- Eugène-Jean-Marie Polge (25 Apr 1968—25 Jun 1970);
- Jean Cuminal (2 Jan 1975—6 May 1982);
- Emerson John Moore (3 Jul 1982—14 Sep 1995);
- Walter Pérez Villamonte (16 Dec 1995—7 Mar 1998);
- Claudio Silvero Acosta (26 Mar 1998 Appointed —).

== Literature ==
- Broughton, T.R.S. (1929) The Romanization of Africa Proconsularis (Baltimore and Oxford: The Johns Hopkins Press and OUP)
- Dessau, H. (1901) "Curubis" R.E. IV 1893
- Mommsen, T., (1895) "Inschriften von Curubis und Lilybaeon", Hermes 30, 456-62 (online at Gallica)
- Trousset, P. (1994) "Curubis (Korba)" Encyclopédie Berbère, 2157 (Aix-en-Provence: Édisud) ISBN 2-85744-201-7

== Population ==
2014 Census
Homes	Families	Males	Females	Total
15273	12598	24433	23857	48290
