= Salvador Ribera Avalos =

Most Reverend Salvador Ribera Avalos
- Bishop of Quito
- Church: Catholic Church
- Diocese: Diocese of Quito
- In office: 1605–1612
- Predecessor: Luis López de Solís
- Successor: Hernando de Arias y Ugarte

Orders
- Consecration: 23 October 1605

Personal details
- Died: 1612 Quito, Ecuador

Salvador Ribera Avalos, O.P. (died 1612) was a Roman Catholic prelate who served as Bishop of Quito (1605–1612).

== Biography ==
Salvador Ribera Avalos was ordained a priest in the Order of Preachers. On 17 August 1605, he was appointed during the papacy of Pope Leo XI as Bishop of Quito. On 23 October 1605, he was consecrated bishop. He served as Bishop of Quito until his death in 1612.

While bishop, he was the principal co-consecrator of Pedro Ponce de Léon, Bishop of Ciudad Rodrigo (1605).

== External links and additional sources ==
- Chow, Gabriel. "Metropolitan Archdiocese of Concepción (Chile)". GCatholic.org. (for Chronology of Bishops) ^{[self-published]}
- Cheney, David M. "Archdiocese of Quito". Catholic-Hierarchy.org. (for Chronology of Bishops) ^{[self-published]}

Catholic Church titles
Preceded by Luis López de Solís	Bishop of Quito; 1605–1612	Succeeded by Hernando de Arias y Ugarte
