= Diego de Zambrana =

Most Reverend Diego de Zambrana
- Archbishop-Elect of La Plata o Charcas
- Church: Catholic Church
- Archdiocese: Archdiocese of La Plata o Charcas
- In office: 1608–1609
- Predecessor: Luis López de Solís
- Successor: Alonso de Peralta

Personal details
- Died: 1609

Diego de Zambrana (also Diego de Zambrana y Guzmán or Diego de Carmona) (died 1609) was a Roman Catholic prelate who was Archbishop Elect of La Plata o Charcas (1608–1609) and Bishop Elect of La Paz (1605–1608).

== Biography ==
On 4 July 1605, Diego de Zambrana was appointed during the papacy of Pope Paul V as the first Bishop of La Paz but never arrived to take possession. On 14 January 1608, he was instead appointed during the papacy of Pope Paul V as Archbishop of La Plata o Charcas. He died soon after in 1609 before he was consecrated.

== External links and additional sources ==
- Cheney, David M. "Archdiocese of La Paz". Catholic-Hierarchy.org. (for Chronology of Bishops) ^{[self-published]}
- Chow, Gabriel. "Metropolitan Archdiocese of La Paz (Bolivia)". GCatholic.org. (for Chronology of Bishops) ^{[self-published]}
- Cheney, David M. "Archdiocese of Sucre". Catholic-Hierarchy.org. (for Chronology of Bishops) ^{[self-published]}
- Chow, Gabriel. "Metropolitan Archdiocese of Sucre (Bolivia)". GCatholic.org. (for Chronology of Bishops) ^{[self-published]}

Catholic Church titles
Preceded by None	Bishop Elect of La Paz; 1605–1608	Succeeded by Domingo Valderrama y Centeno
Preceded by Luis López de Solís	Archbishop Elect of La Plata o Charcas; 1608–1609	Succeeded by Alonso de Peralta
