= Cathedral Basilica of Potosí =

Coordinates: 19.5885°S 65.7527°W

- Catedral Basílica de Nuestra Señora de La Paz
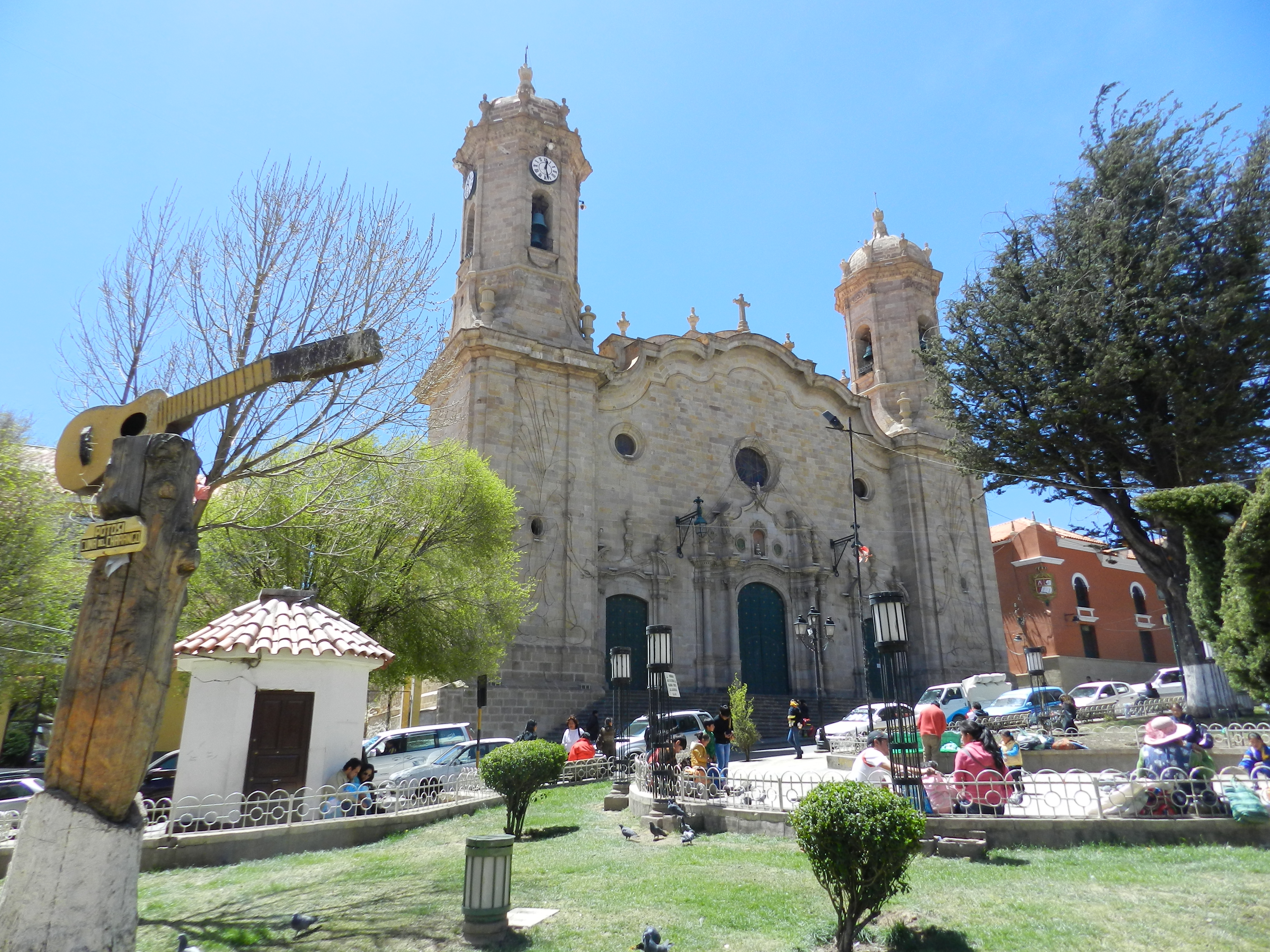
- Cathedral Basilica of Potosí
- Location: Potosí
- Country: Bolivia
- Denomination: Roman Catholic Church

The Cathedral of Villa Imperial de Potosí or Cathedral of Potosí, the official name is Cathedral Basilica of Nuestra Señora de La Paz is a minor basilica and cathedral with baroque and neoclassical colonial influence. It has a stone façade and is located in Plaza 10 de Noviembre in the center of this Bolivian city of Potosí. It was built between 1809 and 1836 on the site where the old church collapsed in 1807. Its main promoter was the Friar Manuel Sanahuya.

The 19th century entered the Neoclassical style, leaving us, among other works, its maximum example, the new Major Church, today the Cathedral Basilica corresponding to the years 1809-1836, and whose author was the Spanish, Franciscan friar and architect by profession Manuel de Sanahuja, introducer in Potosí of the Neoclassical style, who simultaneously to the Cathedral did other works in both religious and civil architecture. The hand of Sanahuja is evident in the cathedral in the quality of its architectural space that incorporates reredos designed by himself. Moved to La Paz, he died there in 1834. Local architecture ends with the Potosí cathedral, and the series of great cathedrals in Latin America reaches its culmination in the Neoclassical style.

Inside there are important religious relics of gold and silver. Also an organ donated by Simón I. Patiño. One sector functions as a museum of religious art.

The current Cathedral Basilica, which occupies the same space as its predecessor, is the work of the architect Friar Manuel de Sanahuja, who began it on Tuesday, September 6, 1808. It was completed in 1836, consecrating it solemnly on April 4, 1838, in the Presidency of Marshal Andrés de Santa Cruz, who sponsored the ceremony.

== History ==
Commonly called the la Matriz. Originally it would have begun in 1564, according to the plan of the master Juan Miguel de la Veramendi, who could not continue the work because he died, so it was necessary, that the request of the mitred of La Plata, from Lima In 1568, the economic income that supports the work is officially authorized.

At the beginning of 1572, Juan de Ballejo entrusted Pedro Moreno so that together with him he would take over the masonry work of the church, and only upon the arrival of Viceroy Francisco de Toledo at the end of said year of 1572, the work was restarted, beginning from the foundations. Its finish, in addition to being expensive, lasted until the end of the century; Well, in 1597 the carpenter Pedro Gutiérrez, in charge of the high choir, sent his colleague Alonzo de la Plaza to run with the work.

Bartolomé Arzáns de Orsúa y Vela, testifies in his monumental Historia de la Villa Imperial de Potosí as follows: "Later, Viceroy Toledo had the main church moved to where it currently stands, which is in the middle of the large population and opposite the Cerro Rico, and the old church was erected as a parish for Indians, naming it San Lorenzo. They began to lay the foundations in the middle of December of this year of 1572; and on the same day the work of the great Mint House and royal saving banks began."

In 1628, master Diego Sayago was commissioned to build a brick portal in the chapel of mercy, which was part of the church. The temple had a single nave with a transept. The main and side portals were similar and Renaissance in design. It had a single tower, originally one body, until 1734, the year in which its remodeling began, to raise it to two bodies. This church survived until the beginning of the 19th century, when, having carried out other remodeling works without consultation, the stability of the tower was compromised, and when it collapsed in 1807, it was forced to think about the construction of a single new church.

== Gallery ==
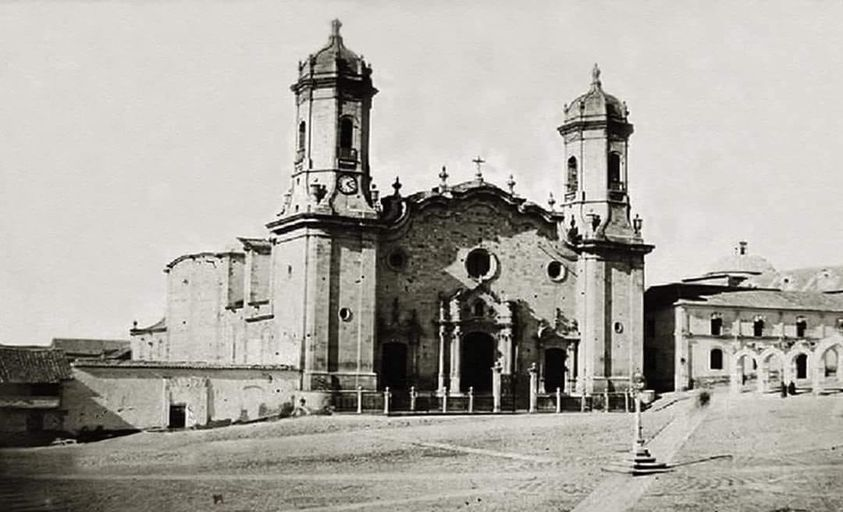
Cathedral of Potosí in 1876.

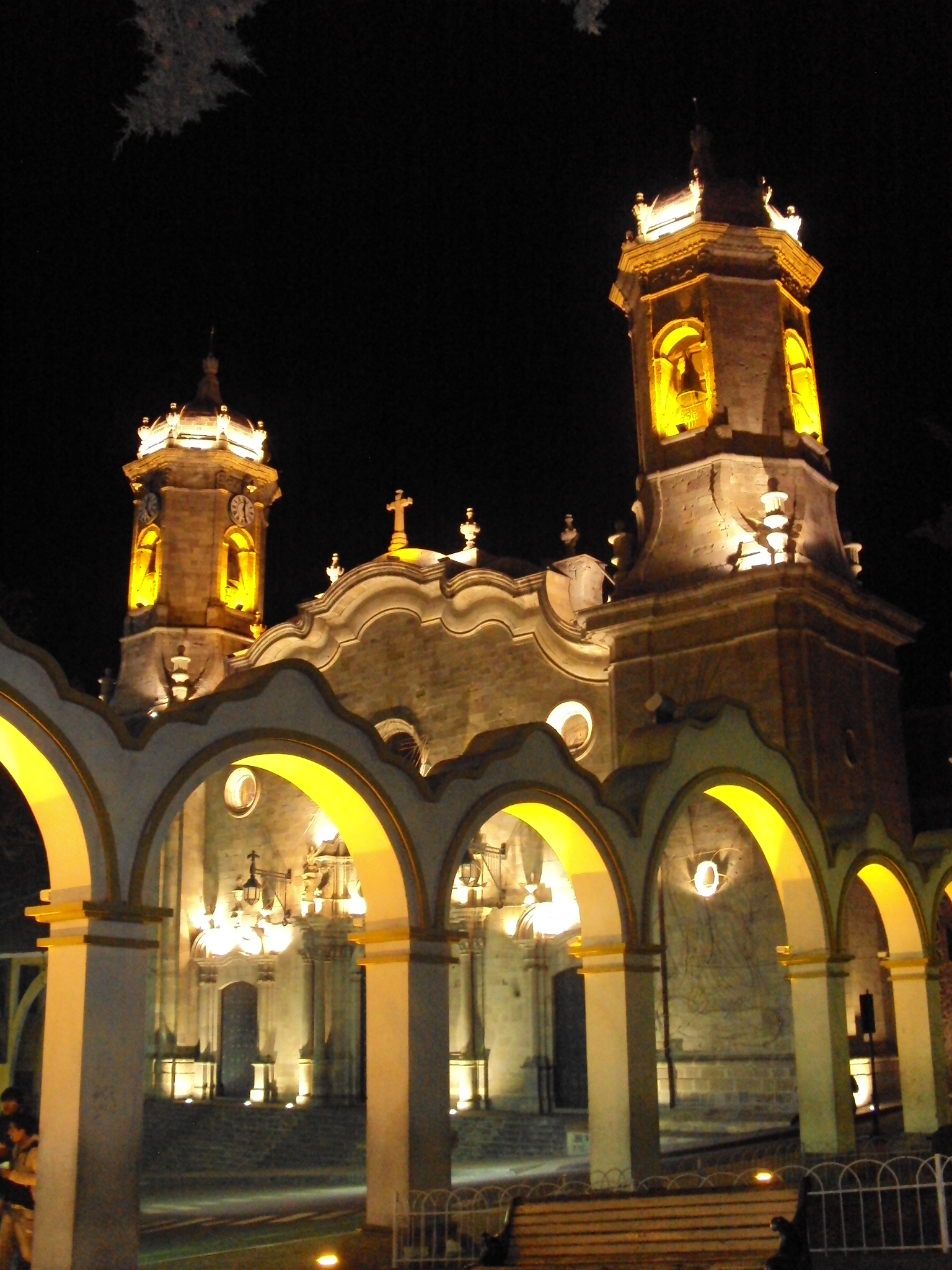
Night view

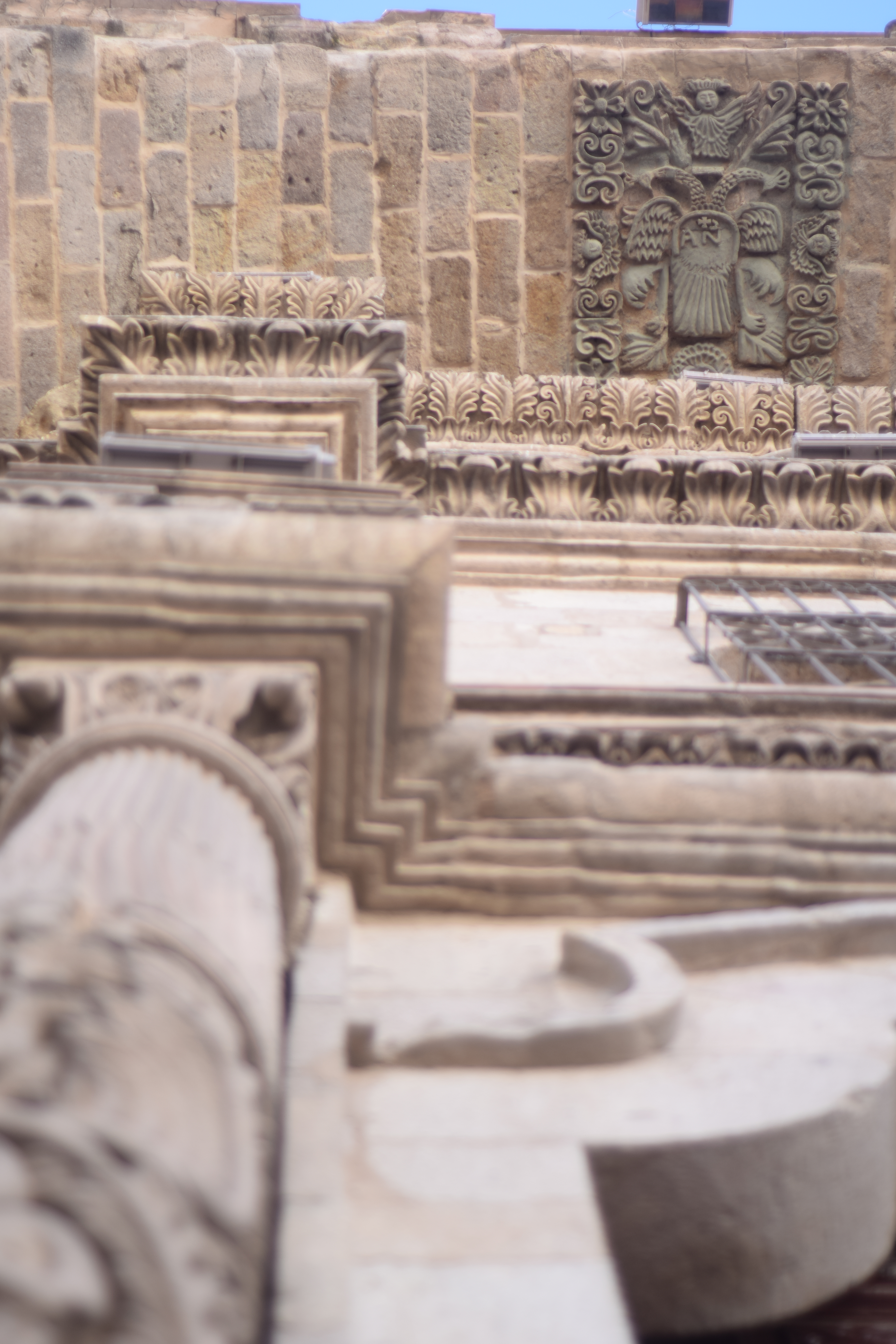

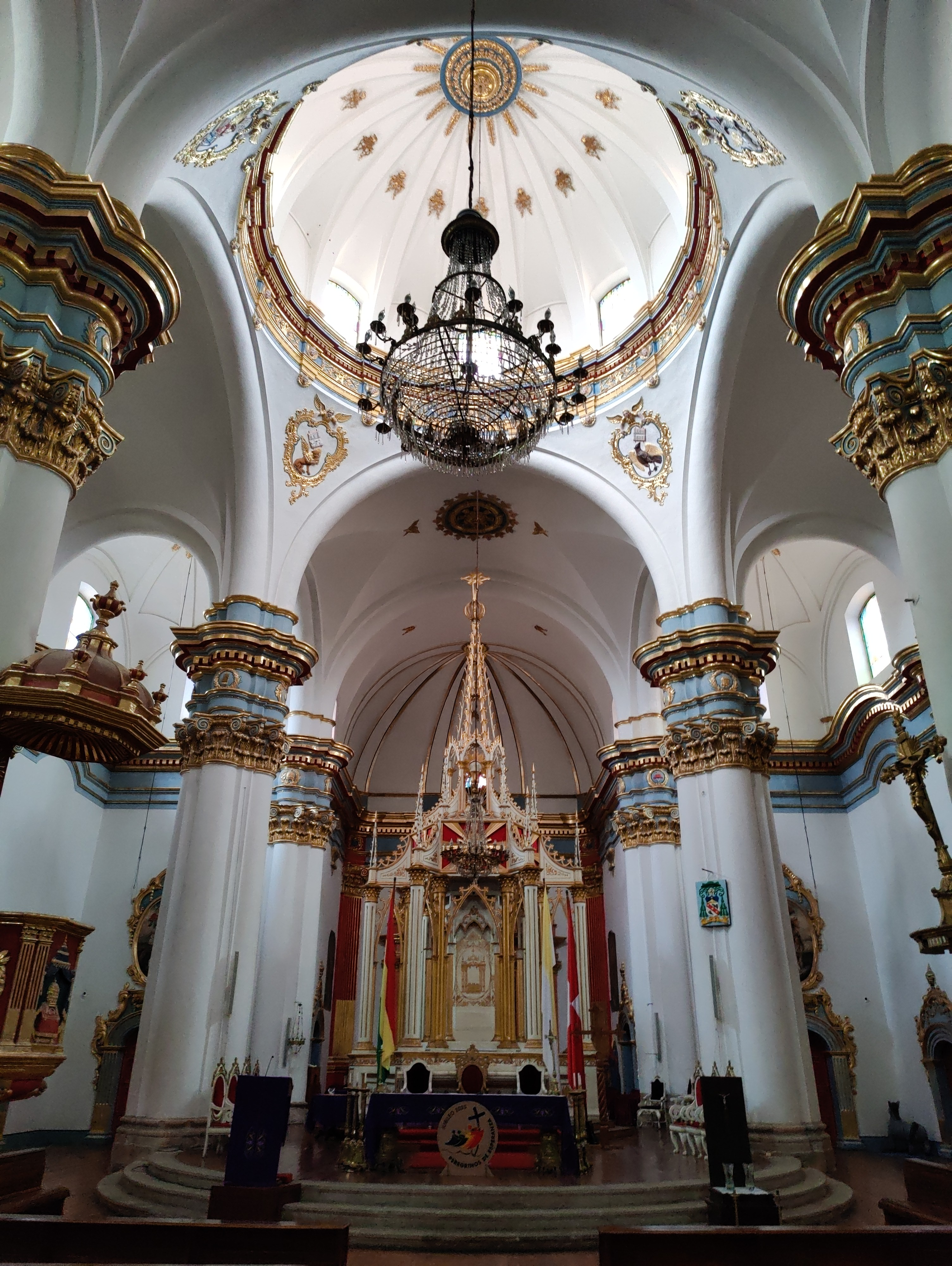
inside the Cathedral

== See also ==
- Roman Catholicism in Bolivia
- Cathedral Basilica of Our Lady of Peace
