= Nigizubi =

Nigizubi was a Roman–Berber town in the province of Numidia. It was located in modern Algeria. It was also the seat of an ancient bishopric. during the Vandal Kingdom and Roman Empire. The exact location of the ancient town is now lost but it was somewhere in north-eastern Algeria.

== Bishopric ==
The only known bishop of this diocese was the Donatist bishop, Gaudenzio, who took part in the Council of Carthage (411), between Catholic and Donatist bishops in Numidia.

The diocese ceased to effectively function following the Muslim conquest of the Maghreb in the 7th century. Today Nigizubi Diocese survives as a titular bishopric and the current bishop is Adolfo Eduardo José Bittschi Mayer, of Sucre.
