= Abel Costas Montaño =

20th and 21st-century Bolivian Catholic bishop

His Excellency Abel Costas Montaño
- Bishop Emeritus of Tarija
- Church: Roman Catholic Church
- See: Diocese of Tarija
- Installed: December 11, 19741
- Term ended: October 20, 1995
- Predecessor: Juan Niccolai
- Successor: Adhemar Esquivel Kohenque
- Previous post: Auxiliary Bishop of Cochabamba (1968-1974)

Orders
- Ordination: 22 September 1945
- Consecration: 6 January 1969 by Paul VI

Personal details
- Born: May 25, 1920 Pocona, Bolivia
- Died: February 11, 2015 (aged 94) Cercado, Bolivia

Abel Costas Montaño (May 25, 1920 – February 11, 2015) was a Bolivian prelate of the Roman Catholic Church.

Costas Montaño was born in Pocona, Bolivia and was ordained a priest on September 22, 1945. He was appointed auxiliary archbishop of the Archdiocese of Cochabamba on November 11, 1968, as well as titular bishop of Novi, and was ordained bishop on January 6, 1969. Montaño was appointed Bishop of the Diocese of Tarija on December 11, 1974, where he would serve until his retirement on October 20, 1995.
