= Turibius of Mogrovejo =

Spanish prelate

Saint Toribio Alfonso de Mogrovejo
- Archbishop of Lima
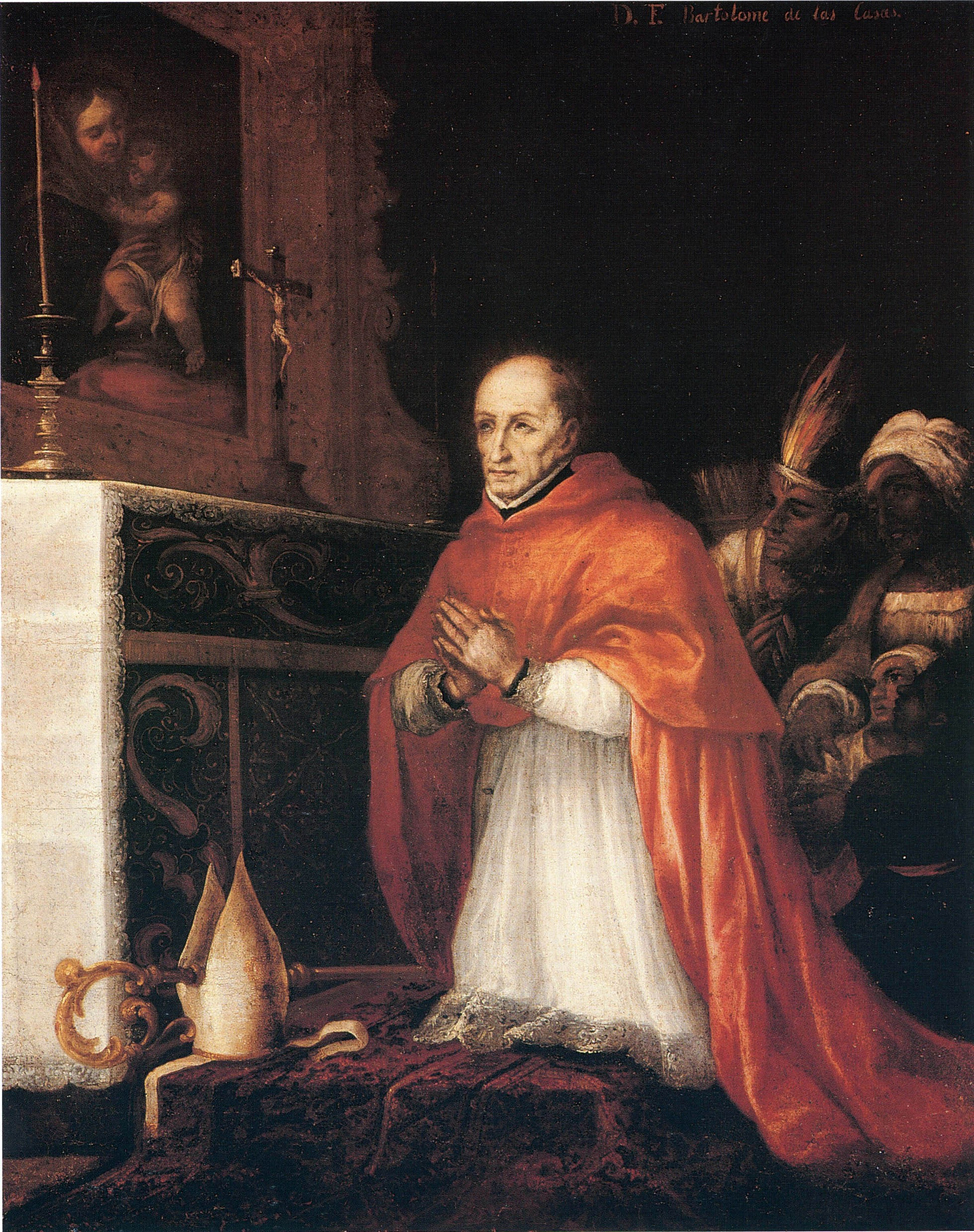
- Church: Catholic Church
- Archdiocese: Lima
- See: Lima
- Appointed: 16 May 1579
- Installed: 24 May 1581
- Term ended: 23 March 1606
- Predecessor: Diego Gómez de Lamadrid
- Successor: Bartolomé Lobo Guerrero

Orders
- Ordination: 1578
- Consecration: 23 August 1580 by Cristóbal Rojas Sandoval
- Rank: Bishop

Personal details
- Born: Toribio Alfonso de Mogrovejo; 16 November 1538 Mayorga de Campos, Kingdom of León, Habsburg Spain
- Died: 23 March 1606 (aged 67) Saña, Viceroyalty of Peru, Spanish Empire
- Buried: Lima Cathedral, Peru; 12.05° S, 77.03° W
- Denomination: Roman Catholic
- Parents: Luis Alfonso de Mogrovejo and Ana de Roblès i Morán
- Occupation: Priest
- Education: Law
- Alma mater: University of Coimbra; University of Valladolid; University of Salamanca

Sainthood
- Feast day: 23 March; 27 April (Former)
- Venerated in: Roman Catholic Church
- Beatified: 2 July 1679; Rome, Papal States by Pope Innocent XI
- Canonized: 10 December 1726; Rome, Papal States by Pope Benedict XIII
- Attributes: Episcopal attire
- Patronage: Peru; Lima; Latin American bishops; Native rights; Scouts; Valladolid

Ordination history of Turibius of Mogrovejo
History
Priestly ordination
- Date: 1578
Episcopal consecration
- Consecrated by: Cristóbal Rojas Sandoval
- Date: 23 August 1580
- Place: Seville, Seville, Habsburg Spain
Episcopal succession
Bishops consecrated by Turibius of Mogrovejo as principal consecrator
- Alfonso Guerra, O.P.: 12 August 1582
- Bartolomé Martinez Menacho y Mesa: 4 September 1588
- Alfonso Fernández de Bonilla: 1593
- Luis López de Solís, O.E.S.A.: 3 April 1594
- Alonso Ramírez Vergara, O.S.: 1595
- Reginaldo de Lizárraga, O.P.: 24 October 1599
- Juan de La Roca: 1601

Toribio Alfonso de Mogrovejo (16 November 1538 – 23 March 1606) was a Spanish Catholic prelate who served as Archbishop of Lima from 1579 until his death.

He first studied the humanities and law before being appointed as a university professor. His piety and learning had reached the ears of King Philip II, and at the behest of the latter, he went on to become Grand Inquisitor, considered unusual given he had no previous government or judicial experience. His distinguished work for the Inquisition earned him praise from the king, who nominated him for the vacant Lima archdiocese. This was confirmed by the Pope, under protest from Turibius.

Mogrovejo was ordained in the priesthood in 1578, and consecrated as an archbishop in 1580, before setting off for Peru to begin his mission. An eminent and charismatic preacher, he set about baptising and catechising the indigenous people. He confirmed almost half a million people; these included Rose of Lima and Martin de Porres.

A staunch advocate for reform, Turibius set to work restoring some order to the priests of his diocese. He led the worst offenders away from various immoral routines and scandals, meanwhile instituting new educational programmes in priestly training.

After his death, his reputation for holiness and learning lived on, leading to calls for his canonisation. Pope Innocent XI beatified the late archbishop, and Pope Benedict XIII canonised him as a saint on 10 December 1726.

== Life ==
=== Education ===
Toribio Alfonso de Mogrovejo was born 16 November 1538 in Mayorga in the Valladolid province of Habsburg Spain. He was named after Turibius of Astorga. His parents were of aristocratic lineage: Luis Alfonso de Mogrovejo (1510–1568) and Ana de Roblès i Morán (1515–???). Turibius' sister was Grimanese de Mogrovejo i Robledo (1545–1635).

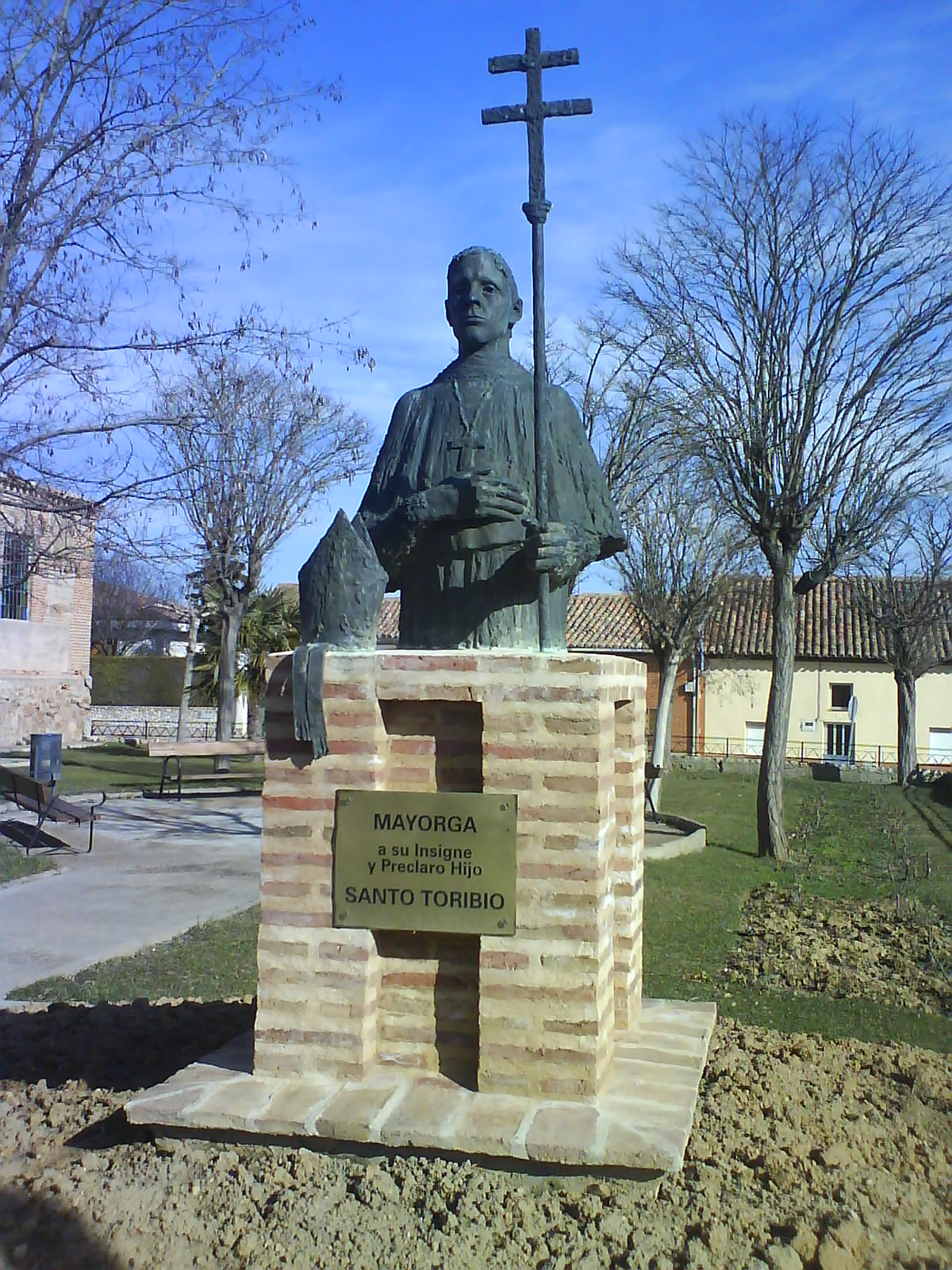
Bust of Turibius at his birthplace in Mayorga de Campos, Valladolid.

As a child, he was recognised as pious, with a strong devotion to the Blessed Virgin. In her honour, he fasted once a week and recited the rosary often.

His education befitted a patrician at the time; he entered the college at Valladolid in 1550, where he studied Humanities. At the University of Salamanca, he studied Law, and subsequently joined its faculty. His uncle Juan de Mogrovejo served as a professor there, as well as at the San Salvador High School in Oviedo.

King Juan III invited Turibius' uncle to teach at the college in Coimbra. Turibius accompanied him, and studied at the college in Coimbra before returning to Salamanca sometime later. His uncle died shortly thereafter. In February 1571 Turibius’ learning and virtuous reputation encouraged King Philip II to appoint him Grand Inquisitor on the Inquisition Court at Granada.

=== Episcopate ===
It was not long before Philip II nominated him for the vacant Lima archbishopric, despite his strong protests. Knowledge of canon law prompted him to remind both king and pope that priests alone could be delegated ecclesial dignities, but the Holy See prevailed. Preparations were made for him to be ordained before the formal announcement. He was ordained to the priesthood in 1578 in Granada (after four weeks’ successively ascending the minor orders). On 16 May 1579, Pope Gregory XIII named him Archbishop of Lima; he was consecrated in August 1580 by the Archbishop of Seville, Cristóbal Rojas Sandoval.

==== Vast territory ====
On 12 May 1581, the new archbishop arrived in Paita. Covering 1,340,000 square kilometres, the diocese was huge, incorporating mountains, jungle and coastline. It was extremely difficult to administer from the capital on the coast. Apart from Spanish, the official tongue, most commonly spoken were Quechua, Kichwa, Aymara, Puquina and Mapuche. Mogrovejo began his new mission travelling the 970 km (600 mi) to Lima on foot, all the while baptising and teaching the local people (even had he managed to average 24 km per day, the journey to Lima would have taken six weeks). A week after he arrived, he was enthroned in his new see. His favourite saying was: "Time is not our own and we must give a strict account of it". Allowing him to make even better use of his time after 1590 was the assistance of the missionary Franciscan, Francis Solanus.

Alone and on foot he traversed his entire archdiocese three times, regardless of inclement weather, ferocious wildlife or tropical heat. He also had to deal with fevers, and was often threatened by hostile tribes. He faced these, all the while baptising and confirming almost half a million people. Among these were Rose of Lima, Martin de Porres, Juan Masías and Francis Solano, who later became a close friend. All would come to be canonised.

Visiting each parish, he would go straight to the church to pray before the altar, and check the condition of all objects used in divine worship, before talking with the priest about the life of the parish. He would then check the parish registers. He made a point of checking that the priest was using the missal that Pope Pius V (in 1570, more than ten years before Turibius' arrival in the viceroyalty) had ordered should be used. It took seven years to complete Turibius' first visitation. His second visitation took four years, but the third was shorter.

Turibius organised for the building of roads and schools as well as chapels and hospitals. He ensured these could be staffed from nearby convents, also instituted by him. Turibius' concern for the very poorest (see next section) extended also to destitute Spanish. Their seeking assistance was constrained by the colony's social norms. Succour from Turibius arrived nevertheless, often without the source coming to light.

==== Indigenous people ====
The start of Turibius' episcopate almost coincided with the end of eleven years under the viceroyalty of Francisco de Toledo, the fifth viceroy. His administration had had a negative impact on the indigenous peoples of Peru, the cost of his bringing political and economic order that had him dubbed as the "best of Peru's viceroys". In Lima, remote from the vast hinterland, was an exploitative society, derived from the encomienda tradition. Mine operators and merchant princes lived an opulent lifestyle, thriving on the enforced labour of the indigenous people. Toledo had taken advantage of the pre-existing practice of forced labour under the mit'a of the Inca Empire, and had expanded it. Called "reductions", Toledo's policy had forcibly relocated many of the indigenous peoples into new settlements, to gather labour to work in mines and other Spanish enterprises, to collect tributes and taxes, and to enforce their Christianisation.

Against this, Turibius was seen as a champion of the rights of the natives. The Spanish had been attracted from their homeland to make their fortunes. They were left with no effective constraint on their using almost any means in their power. Turibius often came across shocking examples of tyranny, maltreatment and cynical indifference to Christian precepts of morality. Redress for abuses by officials was nigh-on impossible. The distance from Spain was insuperable, and communication within the viceroyalty was via sparse roads in a vast territory. He learned the local dialects and fought for rights and liberties, confronting the viceroy's power and control. He was even persecuted by the civil authorities but his patient persistence prevailed.

Eventually Turibius was rewarded with some success. The eighth viceroyal, García Hurtado de Mendoza made efforts to "crack down on the oppression of the indigenous population at the hands of the Spanish colonizers."

==== Clerical formation ====
Partly because of a dearth of good priests, there were among the indigenous people enormous numbers who were baptised but who knew little of the Christian religion. Realising that some clerical behaviour had grown too scandalous to countenance, Mogrovejo sought reformation of priests under his charge. Some came to resent this, though support and assistance was forthcoming from the viceroy. In 1591 he founded the first seminary in the Western Hemisphere. He insisted that learning indigenous languages was a prerequisite.

==== Archdiocesan leadership ====
At Philip II's request he oversaw the Third Provincial Council from 1582 to 1583. He served as president, guiding rather than leading it. Two more provincial councils in 1591 and in 1601 were organised by Turibius. Mogrovejo inaugurated the third Lima Cathedral (i.e. the second rebuild) on 2 February 1604. His tenure also saw thirteen diocesan synods and three provincial councils.

Sometimes civil and ecclesiastical jurisdiction conflicted. Turibius fell out with García Hurtado de Mendoza, the viceroy for six years from 1590. The seminary school was not established without a fight over whether the entrance was to be surmounted by the coat of arms of the bishop, or that of the king. There was also a row over the excommunication of Juan Ortiz de Zárate, mayor of Lima, after he had ordered that a suspected criminal should be taken by force from a church where he had sought refuge.

==== Tridentine reforms ====
Mogrovejo worked to push through the ambitious aims from the Council of Trent, making evangelisation a core theme of his episcopate. He produced a trilingual catechism in Spanish/Quechuan/Aymara in 1584, implementing Trent's call for preaching in indigenous languages. He endorsed the council's decree of excommunication for clerics who engaged in business ventures; these often exploited the indigenous people.

In 1588 Pope Sixtus V confirmed the acts of the Third Council of Lima, implementing Trent's decrees. These acts from Lima were adopted by many South American dioceses.

=== Death ===
It was in Pacasmayo during a pastoral visit that he contracted a fever. He continued working to the end of that visit, and arrived at the Saint Augustine convent in Guadalupe, La Libertad Perú in Zaña in a critical condition. He pulled himself up to receive the Viaticum, and died shortly thereafter at 3:30 pm on 23 March 1606 (Holy Thursday). His final words were those of Jesus Christ on the cross, as in Luke 23:46: "Lord, into Your hands I commit my spirit" His remains were interred in the archdiocesan cathedral in Lima.

== Sainthood ==
Mogrovejo's beatification was celebrated under Pope Innocent XI in 1679 (ratified in the papal bull "Laudeamus"). In the papal bull "Quoniam Spiritus", Pope Benedict XIII canonised him as a saint on 10 December 1726.

At one time celebrated on 27 April, Turibius' liturgical feast is nowadays on 23 March. His cult was once limited mainly to South America, but his pioneering and enduring reforms have now made this more widespread.

In 1983, Pope John Paul II proclaimed him patron saint of the Latin American episcopate.

== See also ==
- List of Catholic saints
- Mogrovejo
- Roman Catholic Archdiocese of Lima
- Saint Turibius of Mogrovejo, patron saint archive

Catholic Church titles
Preceded by Diego Gómez de Lamadrid	Archbishop of Lima; 16 May 1579 – 23 March 1606	Succeeded by Bartolomé Lobo Guerrero
