= Catholic Church in Bolivia =

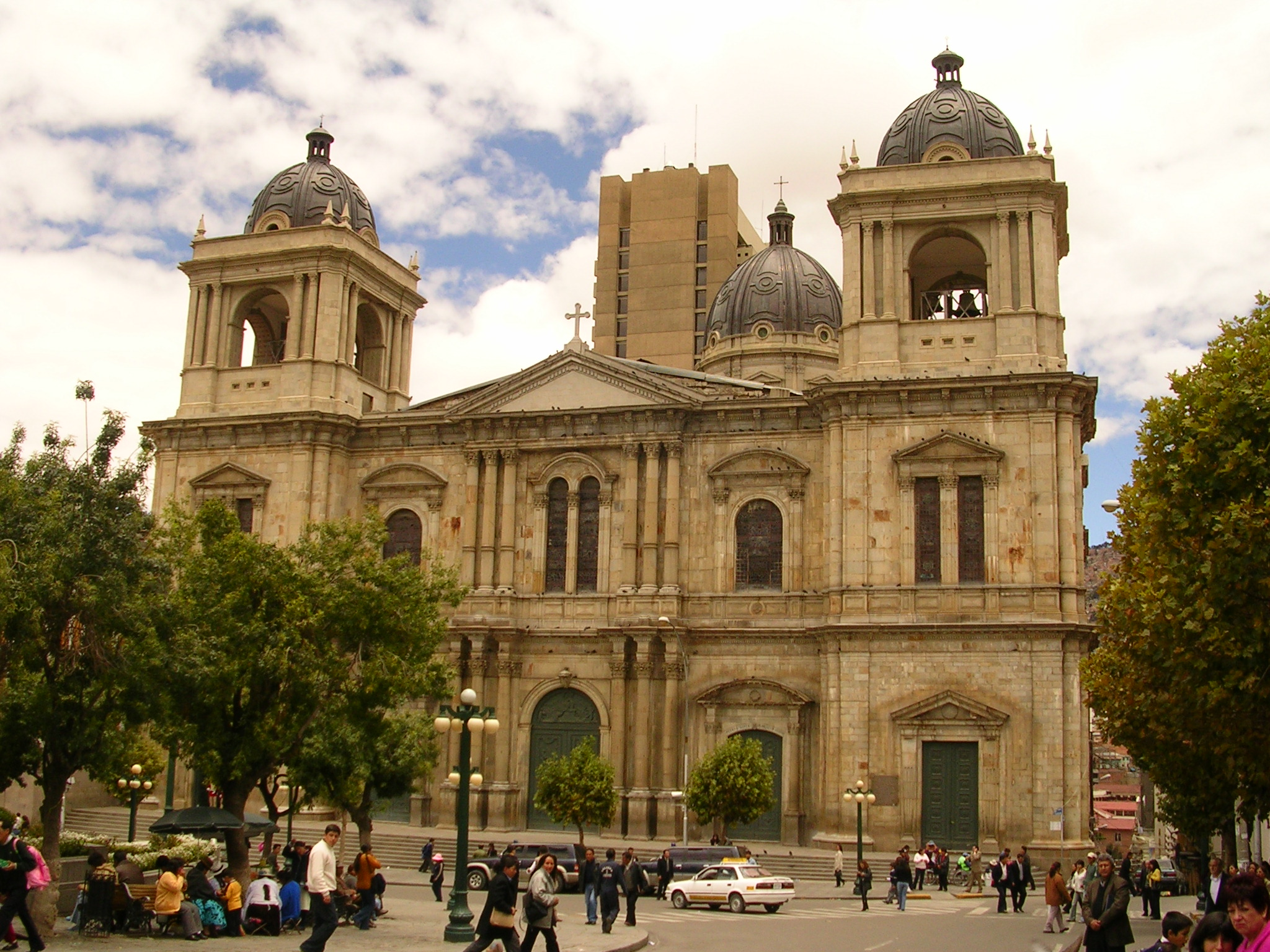
- La Paz Metropolitan Cathedral
- Type: National polity
- Classification: Catholic
- Orientation: Latin
- Scripture: Bible
- Theology: Catholic theology
- Governance: CEB
- Pope: Leo XIV
- President: Aurelio Pesoa Ribera
- Apostolic Nuncio: Fermín Emilio Sosa Rodríguez
- Region: Bolivia
- Language: Spanish; Latin
- Headquarters: La Paz
- Origin: 16th century

Religion in Bolivia (2018)
1. Catholic (70.0%)
2. Protestant (17.2%)
3. Mormon/Jehovah's Witness (1.70%)
4. None (9.30%)
5. Other religion (1.20%)
6. No answer (0.60%)

The Catholic Church in Bolivia is part of the worldwide Catholic Church, under the spiritual leadership of the Pope in Rome. Catholicism was introduced in the 1530s and the first diocese was established in 1552. Evangelization among the Indians bore much fruit from the mid-18th to early 19th century, resuming again in 1840. The country declared independence from Spain in 1825.

Today, Bolivia is a predominantly Catholic country. However, the Church was disestablished as the state religion in early 2009 and lost remaining privileges in 2019 with the promulgation of the law on religious freedom. According to a 2018 survey, 70% of Bolivians were Catholics.

== Organization ==
There are seventeen territorial jurisdictions in the country—four archdioceses, six dioceses, and five apostolic vicariates and two Territorial Prelatures:

- Archdiocese of Cochabamba
  - Diocese of Oruro
  - Territorial Prelature of Aiquile
- Archdiocese of La Paz
  - Diocese of Coroico
  - Diocese of El Alto
  - Territorial Prelature of Corocoro
- Archdiocese of Santa Cruz de la Sierra
  - Diocese of San Ignacio de Velasco
- Archdiocese of Sucre
  - Diocese of Potosí
  - Diocese of Tarija
- Apostolic Vicariates:
  - Camiri
  - El Beni
  - Ñuflo de Chávez
  - Pando
  - Reyes

== See also ==
- Catholic Church by country
- Religion in Bolivia
