= Jesús Gervasio Pérez Rodríguez =

Bolivian Roman Catholic archbishop (1936–2021)

Jesús Gervasio Pérez Rodríguez OFM
- Archbishop of Sucre
- Church: Catholic Church
- Archdiocese: Archdiocese of Sucre
- In office: 6 November 1989 – 2 February 2013
- Predecessor: René Fernández Apaza
- Successor: Jesús Juárez Párraga
- Previous posts: Titular Bishop of Lilybaeum (1985-1989); Auxiliary Bishop of Sucre (1985-1989)

Orders
- Ordination: 29 June 1962
- Consecration: 8 September 1985 by José Clemente Maurer

Personal details
- Born: 19 June 1936 Tamaraceite, Province of Las Palmas, Spanish Republic
- Died: 23 March 2021 (aged 84) Cochabamba, Cochabamba Department, Bolivia

Jesús Gervasio Pérez Rodríquez (19 June 1936 – 23 March 2021) was a Bolivian Roman Catholic archbishop.

Pérez Rodríguez was born in Bolivia and was ordained to the priesthood in 1962. He served as auxiliary bishop and archbishop of the Roman Catholic Archdiocese of Sucre, Bolivia, from 1985 to 2021.
