= Turres Ammeniae =

Africa Roman map

Turres Ammeniae was a Roman–Berber civitas in Africa Proconsulare. It was a Roman Catholic diocese. The ancient bishopric was founded in the Roman province of Numidia, but ceased to function in the 7th century with the Muslim conquest of the Maghreb. The location of the cathedra and seat of the bishopric remains unknown, though thought to be in the territory of Annaba.

The current (November 2017) bishop is Lucio Lemmo of Naples, Italy.
