= Archdiocese of Sucre =

Catholic ecclesiastical territory

Coordinates: 19.0487°S 65.2601°W

Archdiocese of Sucre Archidioecesis Sucrensis Arquidiócesis de Sucre

Catholic
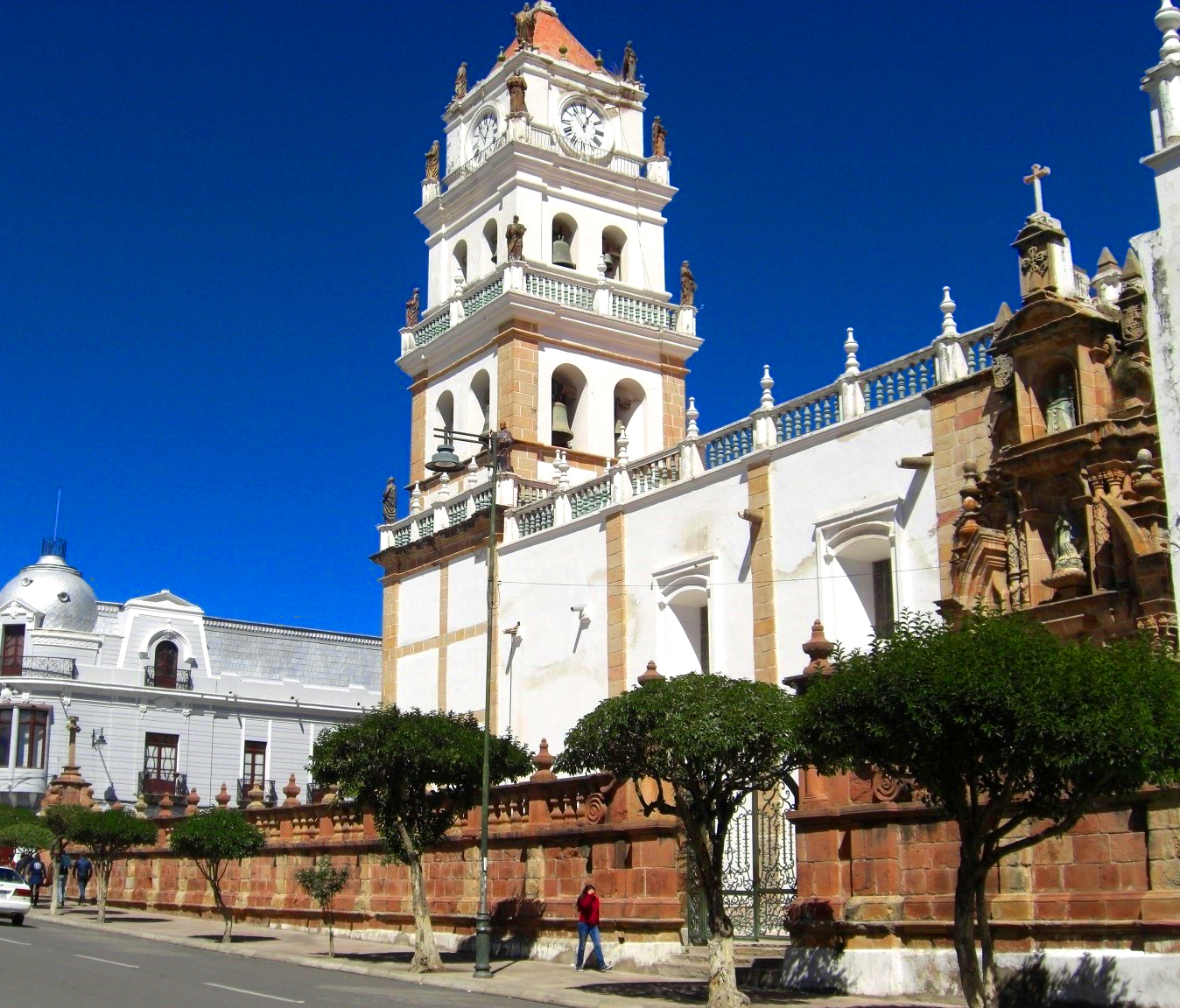
- Cathedral Basilica of Our Lady of Guadalupe

Location
- Country: Bolivia
- Ecclesiastical province: Sucre

Statistics
- Area: 49,975 km^{2} (19,295 sq mi)
- Population: Total; Catholics: (as of 2010); 618,000; 542,000 (87.7%)
- Parishes: 45

Information
- Denomination: Roman Catholic
- Rite: Roman Rite
- Established: 27 June 1552 (474 years ago)
- Cathedral: Cathedral Basilica of Our lady of Guadalupe

Current leadership
- Pope: Leo XIV
- Metropolitan Archbishop: Vacant
- Auxiliary Bishops: Adolfo Eduardo José Bittschi Mayer
- Bishops emeritus: Jesús Juárez Párraga, S.D.B.

Map

Website
- Website of the Diocese

The Roman Catholic Archdiocese of Sucre (Latin: Archidioecesis Sucrensis) is an archdiocese located in the city of Sucre in Bolivia.

== History ==
- June 27, 1552: Established as Diocese of La Plata or Charcas from the Diocese of Cusco in Peru
- July 20, 1609: Promoted as Metropolitan Archdiocese of La Plata or Charcas
- November 11, 1924: Renamed as Metropolitan Archdiocese of Sucre

== Special churches ==
- Minor Basilicas:
  - Catedral Basílica de Nuestra Señora de Guadalupe
  - Basilica de San Francisco in Sucre

== Ordinaries ==
=== Diocese of La Plata or Charcas ===
- Tomás de San Martín, OP (1552–1559 Died)
- Fernando González de la Cuesta (1561–1561 Died)
- Domingo de Santo Tomás, OP (1562–1570 Died)
- Fernando Santillana Figueroa (1572–1574 Died)
- Alfonso Graniero Avalos (1579–1585 Died)
- Alfonso de la Cerda, OP (1587–1592 Died)
- Alonso Ramírez Vergara, OS (1594–1602 Died)
- Luis López de Solís, OSA (1605–1606 Died)
- Diego de Zambrana (de Carmona) (1608–1609 Died before he was consecrated)

=== Archdiocese of La Plata or Charcas ===
- Alonso de Peralta (1609–1614 Died)
- Jerónimo Tiedra Méndez, OP (1616–1623 Died)
- Hernando de Arias y Ugarte (1624–1628 Confirmed, Archbishop of Lima)
- Francisco Sotomayor, OFM (1628–1630 Died)
- Francisco Vega Borja, OSB (1635–1644 Died)
- Pedro de Oviedo Falconi, OCist (1645–1649 Died)
- Juan Alonso y Ocón (1651–1656 Died)
- Gaspar de Villarroel, OSA (1659–1665 Died)
- Bernardo de Izaguirre de los Reyes (1669–1670 Died)
- Melchor de Liñán y Cisneros (1672–1677 Appointed, Archbishop of Lima)
- Cristóbal de Castilla y Zamora (1677–1683 Died)
- Bartolomé González y Poveda (1685–1692 Died)
- Juan Queipo de Llano y Valdés (archbishop) (1694–1713 Died)
- Diego Morcillo Rubio de Suñón de Robledo, OSsT (1714–1723 Appointed, Archbishop of Lima)
- Juan de Necolalde (1723–1724 Died)
- Luis Francisco Romero (1725–1728 Died)
- Alonso del Pozo y Silva (1730–1742 Resigned)
- Agustín Rodríguez Delgado (1742–1746 Confirmed, Archbishop of Lima)
- Salvador Bermúdez y Becerra (1746–1746 Died)
- Gregorio de Molleda y Clerque (1747–1756 Died)
- Bernardo de Arbizu y Ugarte (Appointed 23 May 1757, did not take effect)
- Cayetano Marcellano y Agramont (1758–1760 Died)
- Pedro Miguel Argandoña Pastene Salazar (1762–1775 Died)
- Francisco Ramón Herboso y Figueroa, OP (1776–1782 Died)
- José Campos Julián, OCD (1789–1804 Died)
- Benito María de Moxó y Francolí, OSB (1805–1816 Died)
- Diego Antonio Navarro Martín de Villodras (1818–1827 Died)
- José María Mendizábal (1835– 1846 Died)
- Manuel Ángel del Prado Cárdenas (1855–1858 Died)
- Pedro Jose Puch y Solona (1861–1885 Died)
- Pedro José Cayetano de la Llosa, CO (1887–1897 Died)
- Miguel de los Santos Taborga (1898–1905 Died)
- Sebastiano Francisco Pifferi, OFM (1906–1912 Died)
- Victor Arrién (Arrieu) (1914–1922 Resigned)

=== Archdiocese of Sucre ===
- Luigi Francesco Pierini, OFM (1923–1939 Died)
- Daniel Rivero Rivero (1940–1951 Retired)
- José Clemente Maurer, CSsR (1951–1983 Retired) (Cardinal in 1967)
- René Fernández Apaza (1983–1988 Appointed, Archbishop of Cochabamba)
- Jesús Gervasio Pérez Rodríguez, OFM (1989–2013 Retired)
- Jesús Juárez Párraga, SDB (2 Feb 2013 Appointed – 11 Feb 2020 Retired)
- Ricardo Ernesto Centellas Guzmán (11 Feb 2020 Appointed – 24 September 2026 Died)

== Other affiliated bishops ==
=== Coadjutor archbishop ===
- René Fernández Apaza (1981–1983)

=== Auxiliary bishops ===
- Rafael Andreu Guerrero (1804–1819)
- Matías Terrazas (1827); did not take effect
- Sebastiano Francisco Pifferi, OFM (1905–1906), appointed Archbishop here
- Juan Tarcisio Senner, OFM (1948–1951), appointed Bishop of Cochabamba
- Augustin Arce Mostajo (1958–1984)
- Alfonso Nava Carreón (1969–1984)
- Alejandro Mestre Descals, SJ (1976–1982), appointed Coadjutor Archbishop of La Paz
- Jesús Gervasio Pérez Rodríguez, OFM (1985–1989), appointed Archbishop here
- Walter Pérez Villamonte (1995–1998), appointed Bishop of Potosí
- Adolfo Eduardo José Bittschi Mayer (2008–present)

=== Other priests of this diocese who became bishops ===
- Juan Bravo del Rivero y Correa, appointed Bishop of Santiago de Chile in 1734
- Dionisio Ávila, appointed Bishop of La Paz in 1916
- Ricardo Ernesto Centellas Guzmán, appointed Auxiliary Bishop of Potosí in 2005
- Percy Lorenzo Galvan Flores, appointed Prelate of Corocoro in 2013

== Suffragan dioceses ==
- Diocese of Potosí
- Diocese of Tarija

== See also ==
- Roman Catholicism in Bolivia
