= Lucio Lemmo =

Italian bishop

Coat of arms for Lucio Lemmo.

Lucio Lemmo (born May 23, 1946 in Naples) is an Italian bishop of the Roman Catholic Church. He was ordained a priest on 18 July 1973, and made auxiliary bishop of Naples and titular bishop of Turres Ammeniae in North Africa on 9 January 2010. He was consecrated by Crescenzio Sepe, assisted by Giuseppe Bertello and Antonio Di Donna.
