= José Clemente Maurer =

German Cardinal (1900–1990)

His Eminence José Clemente Maurer C.Ss.R.
- Archbishop Emeritus of Succre
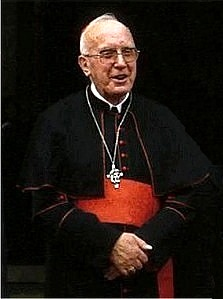

Orders
- Ordination: 19 September 1929
- Consecration: 16 April 1950 by Adeodato Giovanni Piazza
- Created cardinal: 26 June 1967 by Pope Paul VI
- Rank: Cardinal-Priest

Personal details
- Born: José Clemente Maurer; 13 March 1900 Püttlingen, Rhine Province, Kingdom of Prussia (now Püttlingen, Germany)
- Died: 27 June 1990 (aged 90) Sucre, Bolivia
- Buried: Sucre Cathedral

Styles of José Maurer
- Reference style: His Eminence
- Spoken style: Your Eminence
- Informal style: Cardinal
- See: none

José Clemente Maurer, C.Ss.R. (13 March 1900—27 June 1990) was a German Cardinal of the Roman Catholic Church. He served as Archbishop of Sucre from 1951 to 1983, and was elevated to the cardinalate in 1967.

== Biography ==
José Maurer was born in Püttlingen, and entered the Congregation of the Most Holy Redeemer, more commonly known as the Redemptorists, on 10 September 1921. After studying in Switzerland and Luxembourg, he was ordained to the priesthood on 19 September 1925. He then did missionary work with the Bolivian Indians, serving as superior of the Redemptorist residence in La Paz from 1926 to 1947, when he became vice-provincial of his congregation for South America.

On 1 March 1950 Maurer was appointed Auxiliary Bishop of La Paz and Titular Bishop of Cea by Pope Pius XII. He received his episcopal consecration on the following April 16 from Cardinal Adeodato Giovanni Piazza, OCD, with Archbishop Francesco Beretti and Bishop Augusto Sieffert, CSSR, serving as co-consecrators. Maurer was later promoted to Archbishop of Sucre on 27 October 1951 and attended the Second Vatican Council from 1962 to 1965.

Pope Paul VI created him Cardinal Priest of Ss. Redentore e S. Alfonso in Via Merulana in the consistory of 26 June 1967; Maurer was the first cardinal from Bolivia. He was one of the cardinal electors who participated in the conclaves of August and October 1978, which selected Popes John Paul I and John Paul II respectively. Maurer resigned his post as Archbishop on 30 November 1983 after twenty-nine years of service.

The Cardinal died in Sucre, at age 90. He is buried in the metropolitan cathedral.

== External links and additional sources ==
- Cheney, David M. "Archdiocese of Sucre". Catholic-Hierarchy.org. (for Chronology of Bishops) ^{[self-published]}
- Chow, Gabriel. "Metropolitan Archdiocese of Sucre". GCatholic.org. (for Chronology of Bishops) ^{[self-published]}
- Catholic-Hierarchy ^{[self-published]}
- Cardinals of the Holy Roman Church

Catholic Church titles
Preceded by Daniel Rivero Rivero	Archbishop of Sucre; 1951–1983	Succeeded by René Fernández Apaza
