= Miguel de Benavides =

Spanish clergyman and sinologist (d. 1605)

The Most Reverend Miguel de Benavides O.P.
- Archbishop of Manila
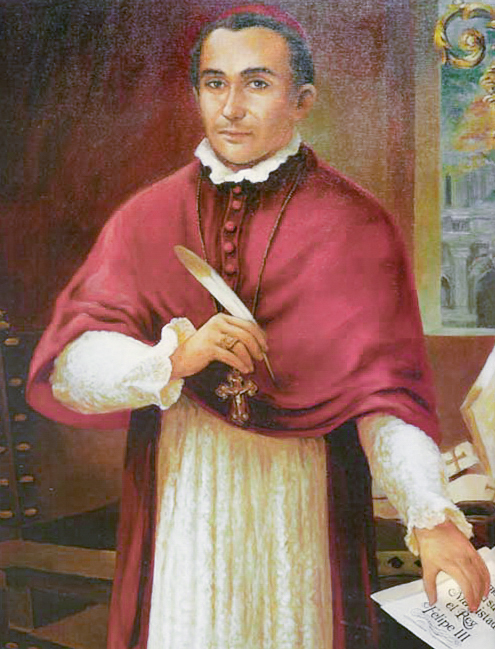
- Province: Manila
- See: Manila
- Installed: October 7, 1602
- Term ended: July 26, 1605
- Predecessor: Ignacio Santibáñez, O.F.M.
- Successor: Diego Vázquez de Mercado
- Other post: Bishop of Nueva Segovia

Orders
- Ordination: 1568

Personal details
- Born: c. 1552 Carrión de los Condes, Habsburg Spain
- Died: July 26, 1605 (aged 52–53) Manila, Captaincy General of the Philippines, New Spain, Spanish Empire
- Denomination: Roman Catholic

Styles of Arzobispo Miguel de Benavides
- Reference style: Monseñor
- Spoken style: Su Excelencia Reverendísima
- Religious style: Reverendísimo

Miguel de Benavides y Añoza, O.P. (c. 1552 – July 26, 1605) was a Spanish Catholic prelate and sinologist who served as the third Archbishop of Manila. He previously served as the first Bishop of Nueva Segovia and was the founder of the University of Santo Tomas in Manila.

== Biography ==
Miguel de Benavides was born in 1552, to a noble family in Carrión de los Condes, Spain. He entered the Dominican Order in San Pablo de la Moraleja, Valladolid, and later rendered service in Colegio de San Gregorio.

He joined the first group of Dominicans going to Manila in 1587, proceeding with them on to China where he hoped to expand the local Catholic church. He was later exiled, and established a hospital for the Chinese in Binondo, Manila, before becoming the head of his order. He accompanied Bishop Domingo de Salazar, the first bishop of Manila, to Spain to defend the native Filipinos against Spanish oppression.

== Bishop ==
He was appointed as the first bishop of Nueva Segovia and was consecrated in Mexico in 1597. Along with Juan Cobo, he authored the Doctrina Christiana in Chinese, one of the earliest books printed in the Philippines. He arrived in Nueva Segovia in 1599 but was, after three years, appointed as the Archbishop of Manila on October 7, 1602. His installation in Manila was financed by King Philip III himself, for Benavides was extremely poor. On September 9, 1603, he directed the Franciscans to oversee the Japanese staying in the Philippines. In the same year, he warned the government about the nascent revolt of the Chinese population although he was also criticized for inciting it with his sermons.

== Death ==
He died on July 26, 1605, in Manila.

Benavides's library and personal property worth ₱1,500 were donated for the establishment of an institution of higher learning, now known as the University of Santo Tomas, which was formally founded on April 28, 1611, nearly six years after his death.

== See also ==
- Archdiocese of Manila
- Archdiocese of Nueva Segovia
- University of Santo Tomas
- Miguel de Benavides Library
- History of University of Santo Tomas
- Catholic Church in the Philippines
- Doctrina Christiana en letra y lengua China – one of the first two books published in the Spanish Philippines, of which Benavides was one of the co-authors

== External links and additional sources ==
- Cheney, David M. "Archdiocese of Manila". Catholic-Hierarchy.org. (for Chronology of Bishops) ^{[self-published]}
- Chow, Gabriel. "Metropolitan Archdiocese of Manila". GCatholic.org. (for Chronology of Bishops) ^{[self-published]}
- Miguel de Benavides Library - University of Santo Tomas
- Roman Catholic Archdiocese of Manila - Official website
- Manila Metropolitan Cathedral - Official website

Religious titles
New diocese	Bishop of Nueva Segovia; 1595–1602	Succeeded by Diego Soria
Preceded by Ignacio Santibáñez	Archbishop of Manila; 1602–1605	Succeeded by Diego Vázquez de Mercado
