= Vigan Cathedral =

Roman Catholic church in Ilocos Sur, Philippines

- Metropolitan Cathedral and Parish of the Conversion of Saint Paul
- Saint Paul Cathedral
- Catedral Metropolitana de la Conversión de San Pablo Apóstol (Spanish)
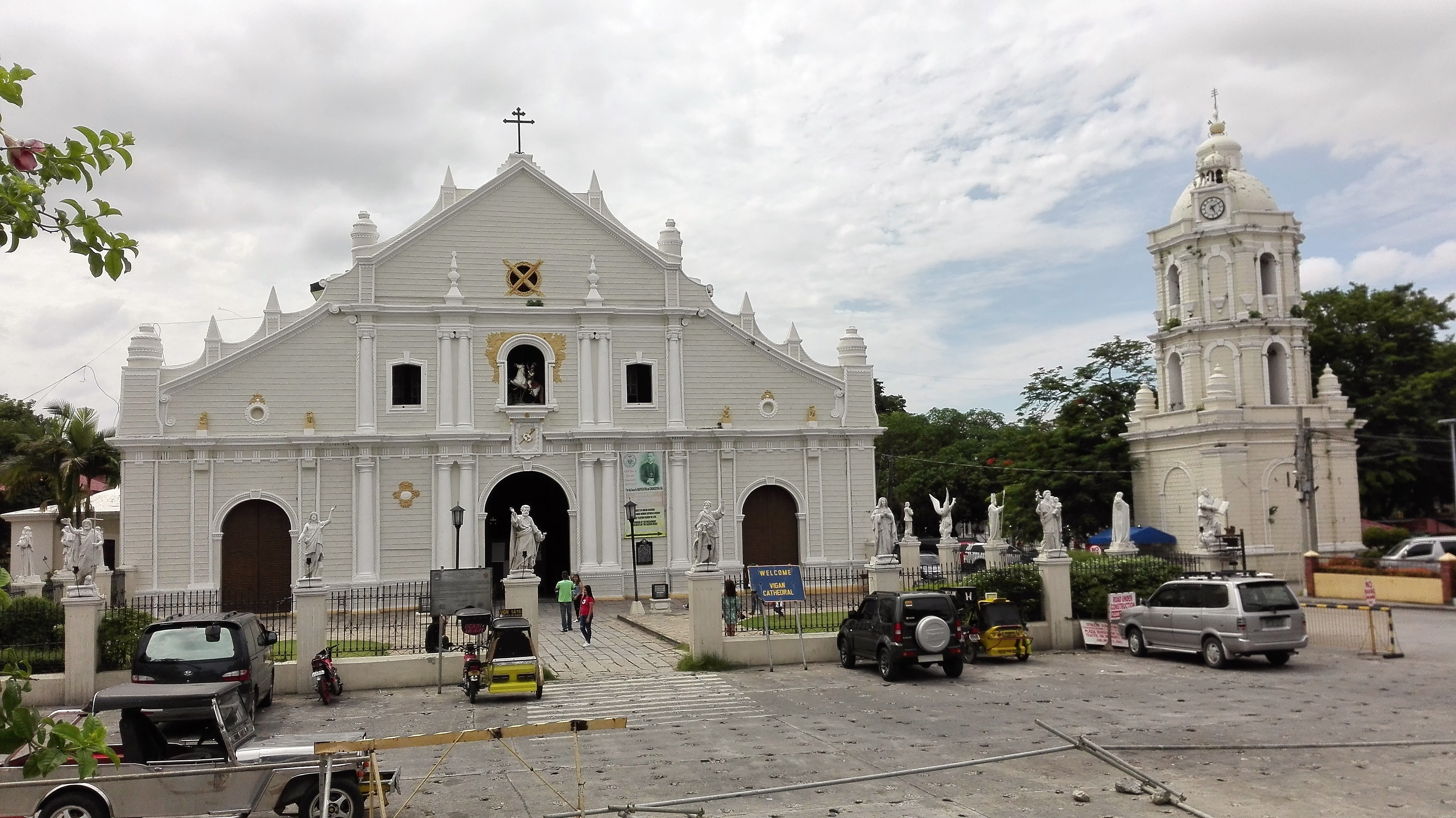
- Church façade in 2018

- Location in Luzon Location in the Philippines
- 17°34′29″N 120°23′20″E
- Location: Vigan, Ilocos Sur
- Country: Philippines
- Denomination: Roman Catholic

History
- Status: Cathedral
- Founded: 1575
- Dedication: Saint Paul

Architecture
- Functional status: Active
- Architectural type: Church building
- Style: Renaissance; Earthquake Baroque
- Groundbreaking: 1790
- Completed: 1800
- Demolished: 2022 (partial due to earthquake)

Administration
- Province: Nueva Segovia
- Metropolis: Nueva Segovia
- Archdiocese: Nueva Segovia
- Deanery: St. Paul the Apostle
- Parish: St. Paul the Apostle

Clergy
- Archbishop: David William Antonio
- Rector: Msgr. Cosmenio Rosimo
- Priests: Fr. Bryan Habungan Garibay; Fr. Ian Paul Filart; Fr. Danilo Martinez; Fr. Rosmel Cairel

UNESCO World Heritage Site
- Official name: Historic City of Vigan
- Criteria: Cultural: (ii), (iv)
- Reference: 502rev
- Inscription: 1999 (23rd Session)

The Metropolitan Cathedral and Parish of the Conversion of Saint Paul, commonly known as Vigan Cathedral and locally known as Simbaan a Dakkel (Large Church) (Note: To differentiate it from the Simbaan a Bassit (Small Church), a cemetery (Campo Santo) chapel which hosts regular church services such as Sunday masses and funeral rites), is a Roman Catholic cathedral in Vigan, Ilocos Sur, Philippines. It contains the cathedra of the Archdiocese of Nueva Segovia. It is part of the UNESCO World Heritage Site declaration for the Historic City of Vigan in 1999.

== History ==
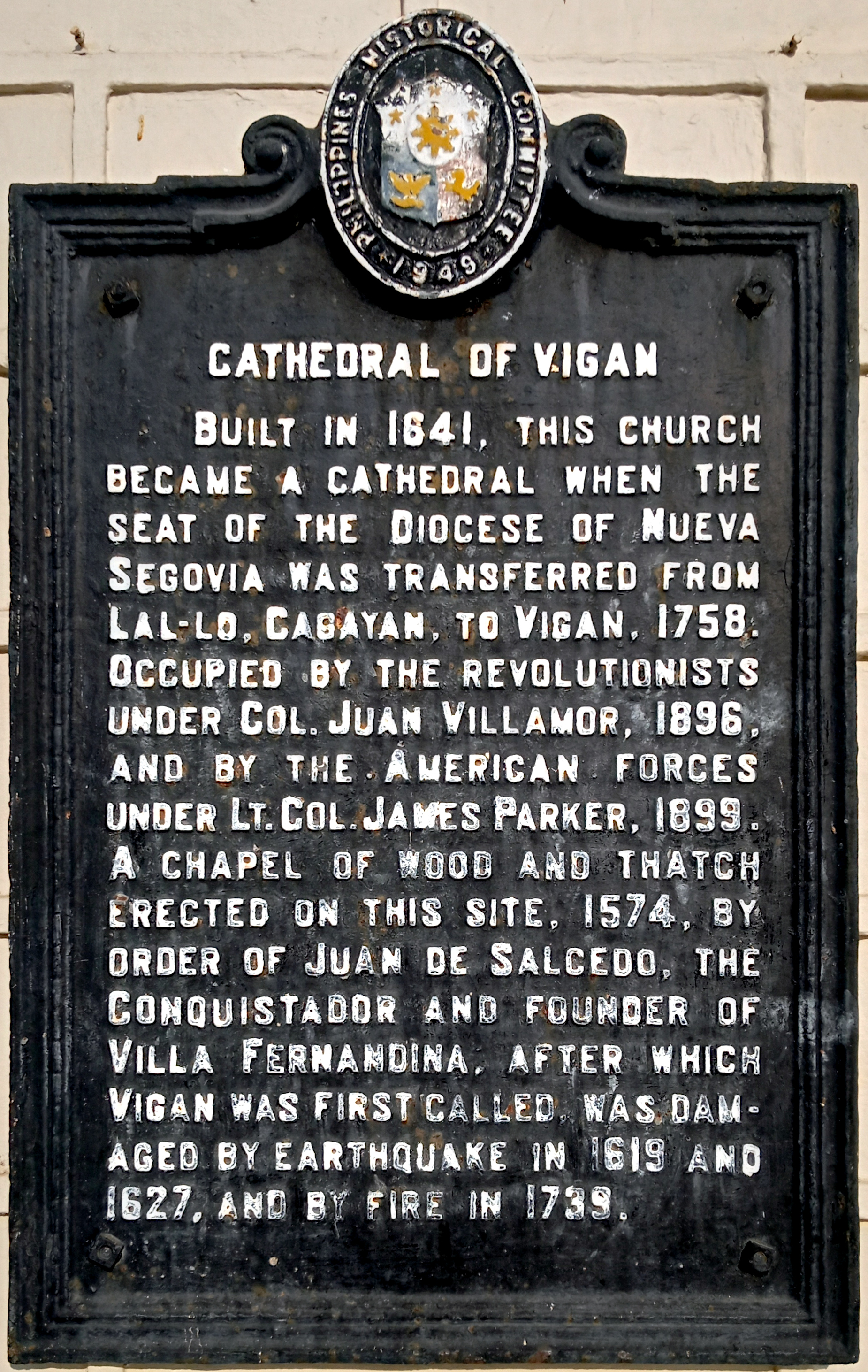
Cathedral PHC historical marker installed in 1949

When Juan de Salcedo came to Vigan, he renamed the town to Villa Fernandina in honor of the young son of King Philip II. Upon the orders of Salcedo in 1574, the first temporary church of Vigan was built out of wood and thatch. With Salcedo is Augustinian priest Alonso de Alvarado who first attempted to Christianize the Ilocos region. The need to construct a permanent church and convent in Vigan was decided by the Augustinian Chapter on April 30, 1575. It became the first parish in Northern Luzon. The plans to construct the church failed since in 1577, the Augustinians vacated Ilocos. The Franciscans then came to Ilocos with Father Sebastian de Baesa as priest of Vigan. In 1591, the supervision was transferred to the secular clergy. Father Gabriel dela Cruz became the first secular priest of Vigan until 1598. When the Augustinians returned to Ilocos in 1586, they also handled Vigan alternately with the secular clergy. On February 14, 1622, Vigan was officially transferred from the Augustinians to the secular.

The first church was built in 1641 and was damaged by earthquake in 1619 and 1627. A third church was burned in 1739. Upon the request of then Bishop Juan de la Fuente Yepes, the seat of the Diocese of Nueva Segovia was transferred from Nueva Segovia (now Lal-lo, Cagayan) to Ciudad Fernandina de Vigan (present-day Vigan) through a ceremonial procession on September 7, 1758. With the transfer of the seat of the Diocese, the church of Vigan became a cathedral on that same year. Governor General Jose de Basco ordered the establishment of a new church in 1786. The fourth and present-day church was built from 1790 to 1800 under the Augustinians. It was occupied by the revolutionists under Colonel Juan Villamor in 1896 and by the American forces under Lieutenant Colonel James Parker in 1899.

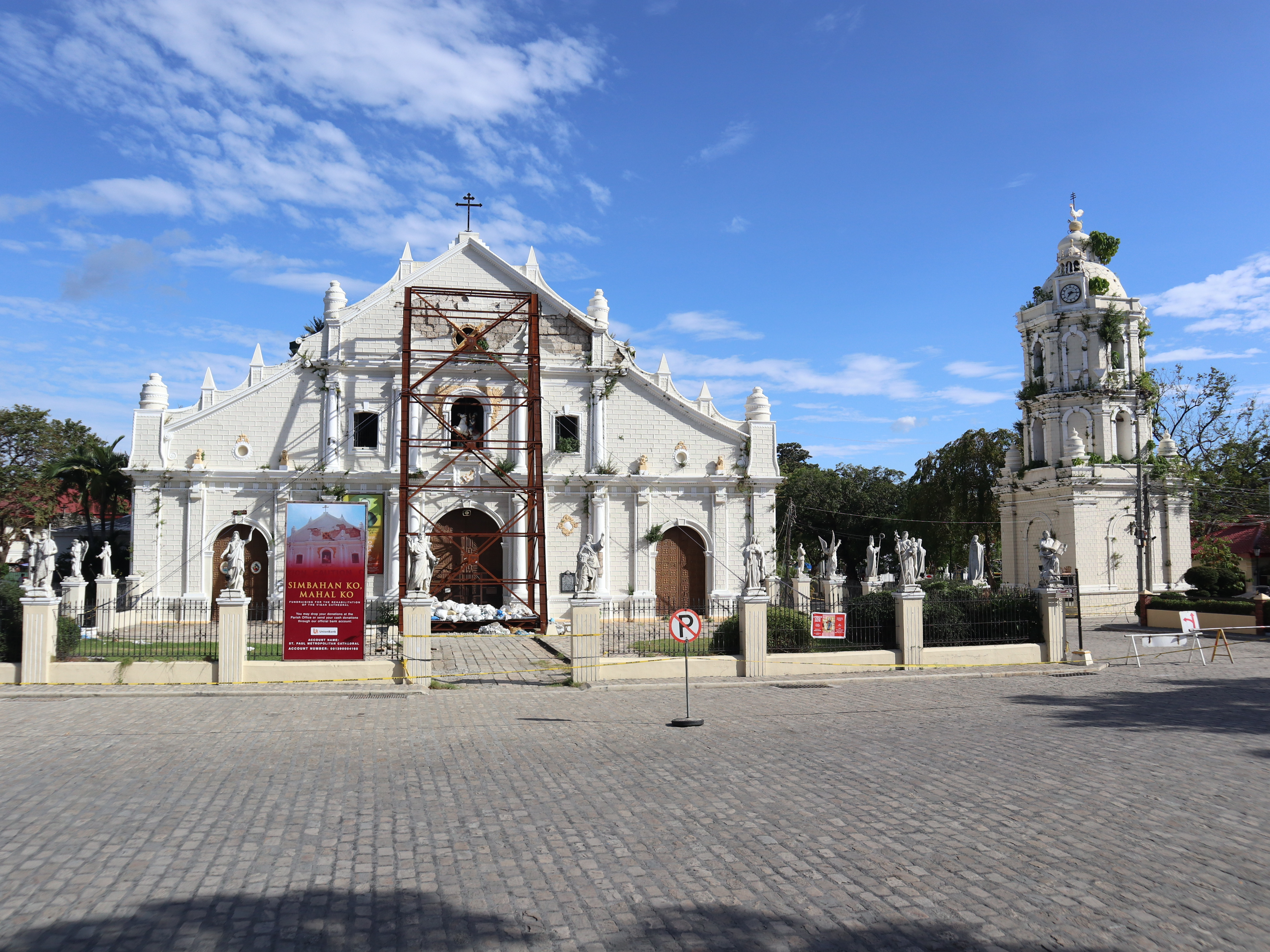
The cathedral undergoing repairs following the July 2022 earthquake

On July 27, 2022, the church was damaged by the 7.0 magnitude earthquake that hit parts of Luzon. Three hours after the earthquake, the Cathedral's rector and parish priest Msgr. Gary Noel S. Formoso announced its temporary closure through the Cathedral's official Facebook page, with its reopening upon the advice from structural engineers on its safety for future use. A week after the earthquake, the Vigan City LGU began implementing a color coding scheme that will assess the structural integrity and safety of the city's buildings; due to extensive damage, both the Cathedral and the adjacent Vigan City Bell Tower were placed under the highest level of "Code Red": the affected structures were closed and cordoned off, all functions and activities within were temporarily ceased, and the surrounding areas were placed off-limits to the general public.

The cathedral of Vigan celebrated its 450 years as a parish on April 30, 2025 since its foundation in 1575.

== Architecture and design ==
The church is predominantly in Earthquake Baroque style with large buttresses on its side. It also has Neo-Gothic, Romanesque and Chinese inspired embellishments. In its interior are silver-paneled main altar, three naves, 12 minor altars and brass communion handrails. Aside from the central retablo, there are two side Neo-Baroque silver-paneled retablos, with the left dedicated to Apo Nazareno and the right dedicated to Apo Birhen del Rosario. The sanctuary has four paintings of the Evangelists flanking either side of the altar while each column in the nave has a painting of each of the Twelve Apostles. Located south of the cathedral is the bell tower, a separate 25 metres (82 ft) tower with a square base and an octagonal form, with a weather vane on top in the form of a rooster, which symbolizes Saint Peter. Seven bells are hung and five can be seen outside; two big bells can be found inside. Located beside the cathedral is the Palacio de Arzobispado de Nueva Segovia, the only remaining Spanish colonial era Archbishop's Palace in the Philippines, and which still retains its original function as the official residence of the archbishop of Nueva Segovia (though his private quarters are housed outside); the palace also houses a chapel usually open to the public, the archdiocesan archives, and an ecclesiastical museum which includes the palace's original throne room and artifacts from various churches in Ilocos Sur. The church also contains remains of former bishops of the Diocese of Nueva Segovia, as well as the remains of Ilocano poet Leona Florentino (she and her husband Elias de los Reyes' grave marker can be seen on a column near the side door facing Plaza Burgos).

Vigan Cathedral interior

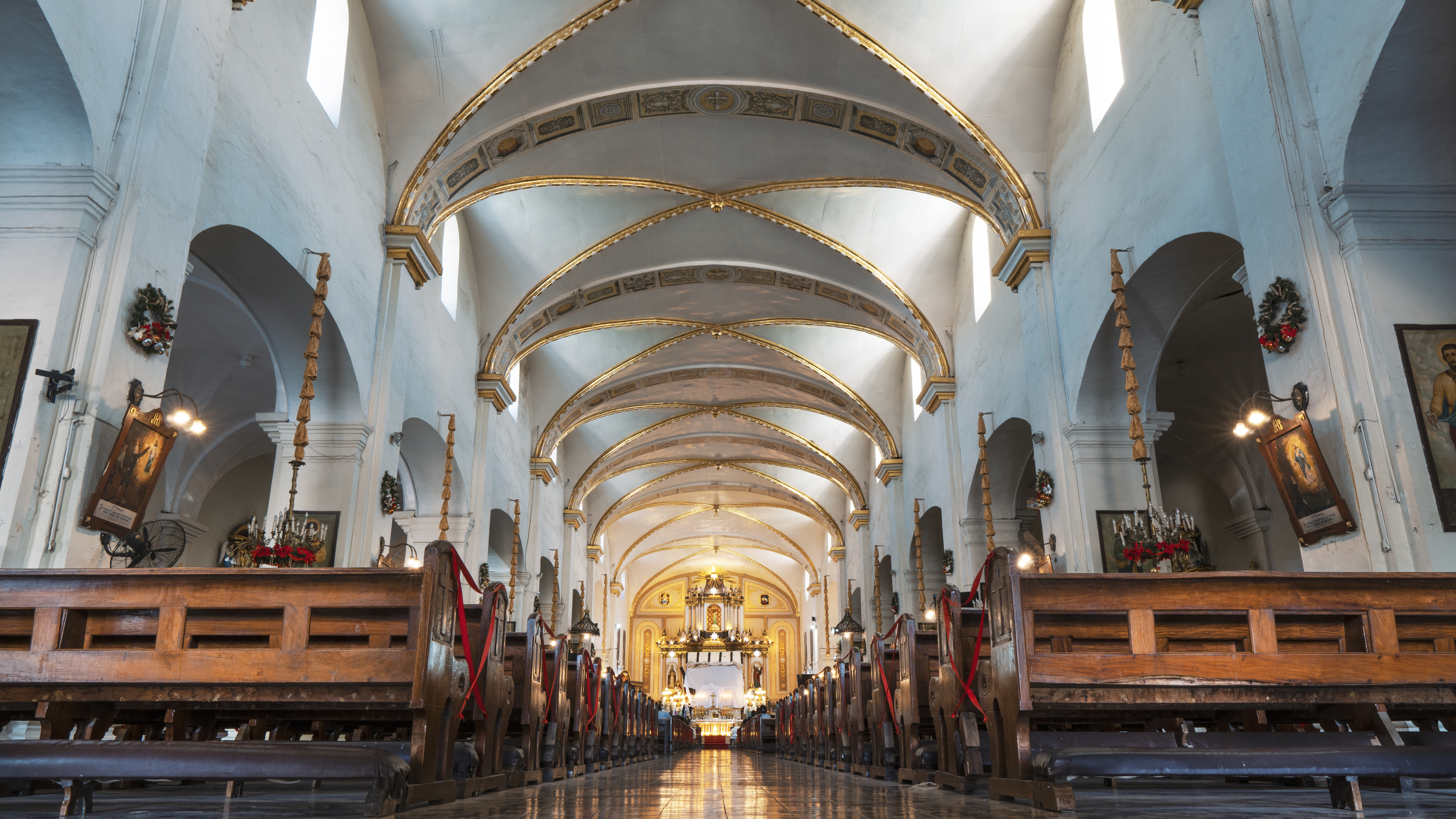
Cathedral nave in 2021

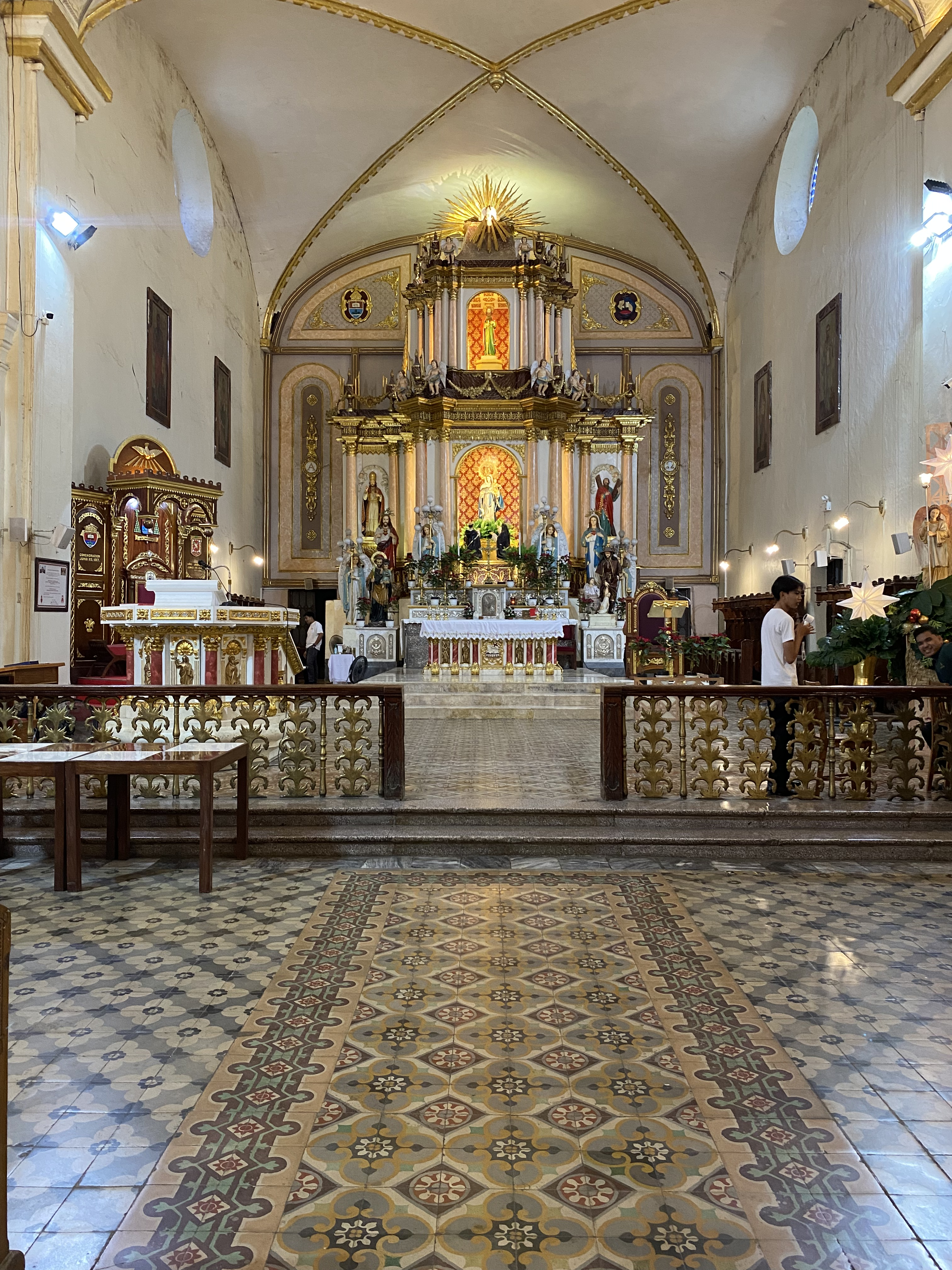
Altar in 2024

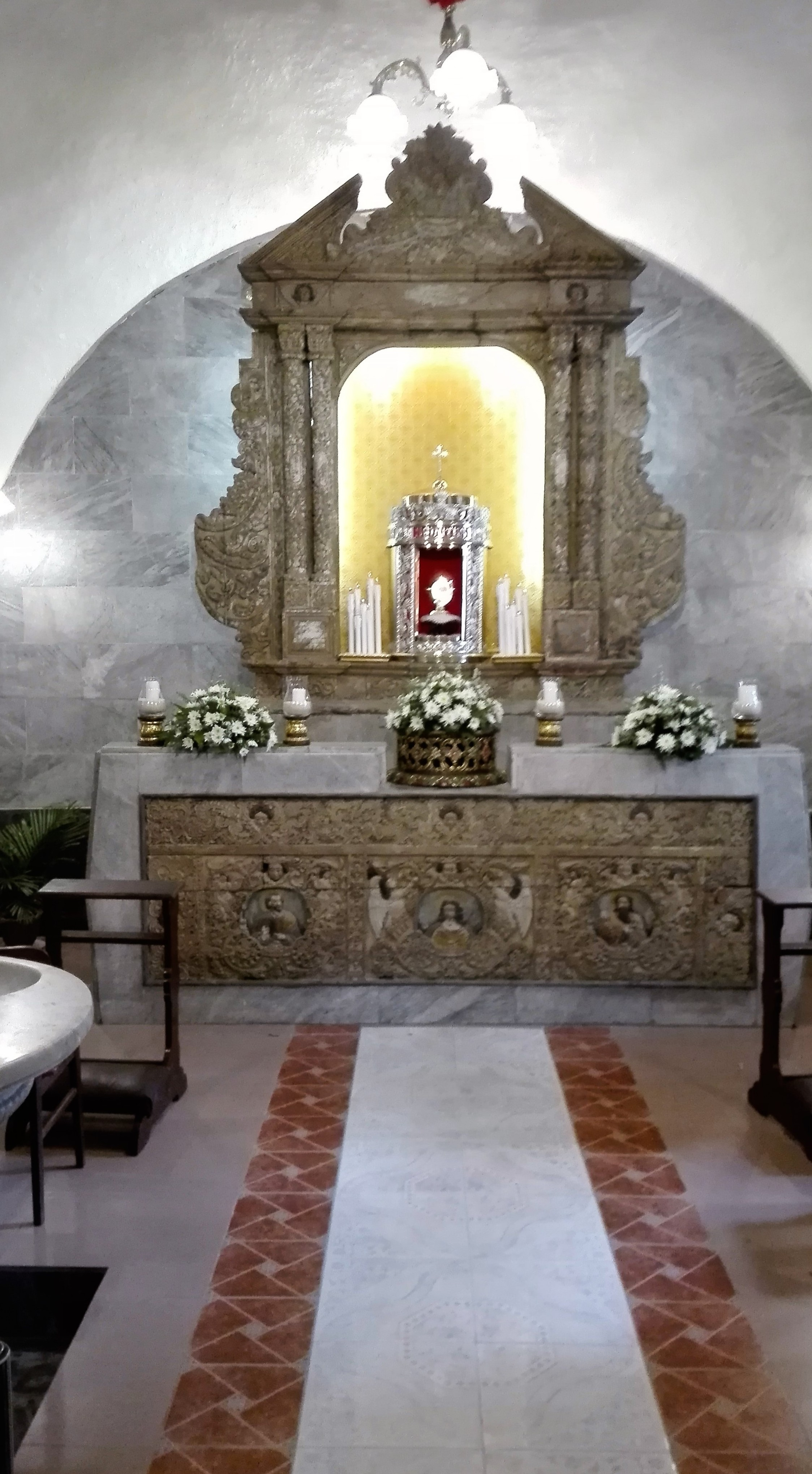
Adoration chapel

Right side retablo dedicated to Apo Birhen del Rosario

Left side retablo dedicated to Apo Nazareno

== Church bells ==
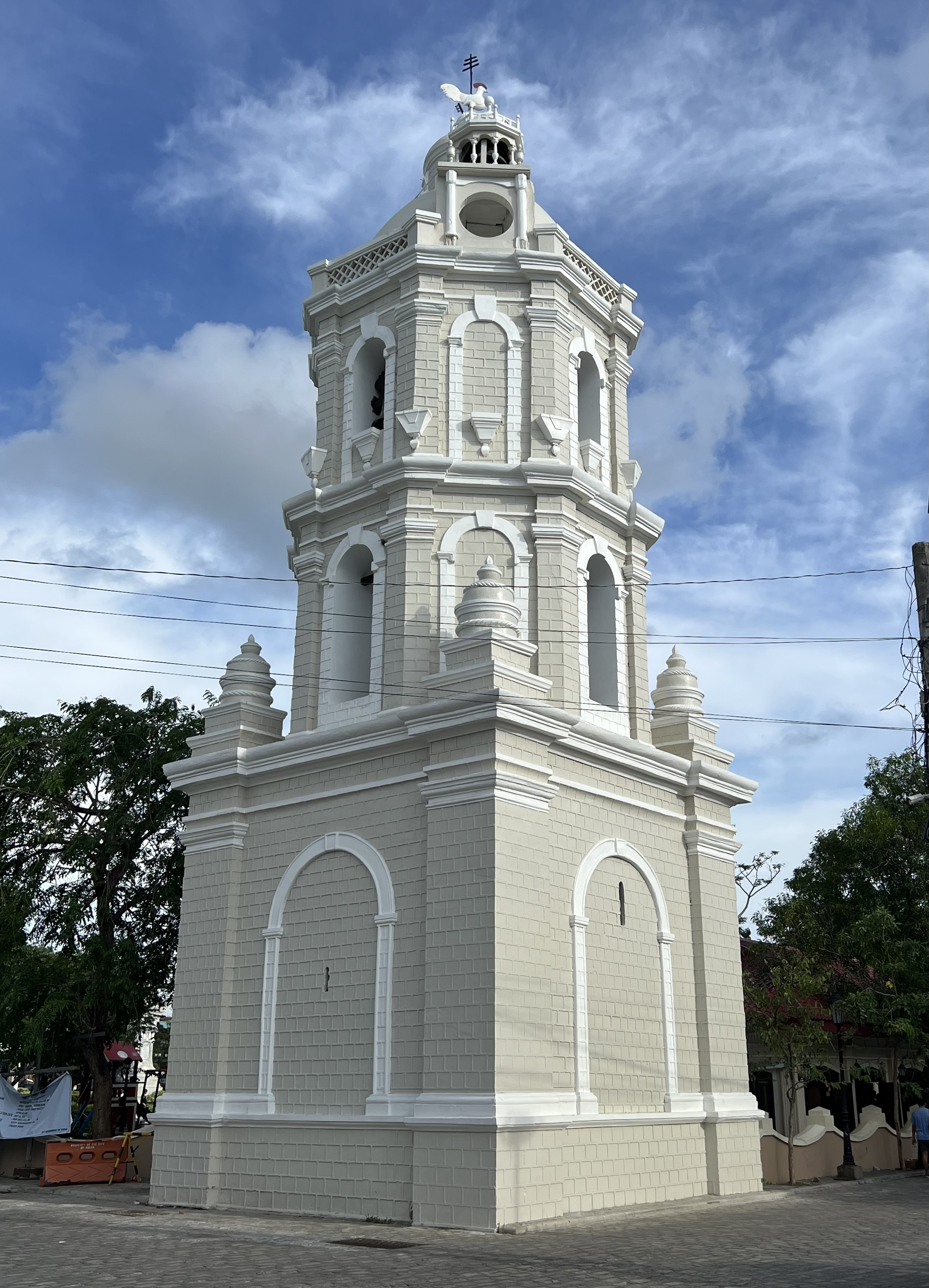
The bell tower in 2026

Vigan Cathedral currently has seven bells plus one atop the clockface, the two largest bells, dedicated to Saint Barbara (cast in 1836) and Nuestra Señora del Rosario, a bell without its clapper along with five others that still produce good sound despite of their age. All the aforementioned bells were probably cast in the early 19th century in an unknown foundry probably in Manila at the time. At the clock, the chimes were of those in Whittington. In addition of the feast of Saint Paul every January the twenty-fifth, and special occasions led by the Archbishop of Nueva Segovia like opening of holy doors and installations, all of its bells ring in peal. It is also rung during processions, and special events of the church. It is always rung every weekend at the time of 6 AM, 12 NN, 3 PM and 6 PM for the Angelus and Divine Mercy its sound could be heard throughout the poblacion and some of the nearby barrios.

The bells was first rung in January 25, 2025 after years of silence since the earthquake in 2022, as it was last rung on the same date of the same year. Three days later, in January the 28th, all the tower bells along with the largest pealed for the Los Patrones Procession signifying the start of Ilocos Sur Festival 2025, to welcome the saints.

As of October 3, 2025 the bell tower is back functioning during the weekends for the angelus and Divine Mercy.

== Burials ==
- Leona Florentino (19 April 1849 – 4 October 1884) was a Filipina foundational poet, dramatist, satirist, and playwright who is also known as the Mother of Philippine Women's Literature. Her works have been met with wide public acclaim from France, Spain, and the United States.
- Alfredo Verzosa (December 9, 1877 - June 27, 1954) was the fourth native Filipino to be elevated as Bishop of the Roman Catholic Church and the first from Northern Luzon – the first Ilocano. He founded the Congregation of the Missionary Catechists of the Sacred Heart (MCSH). His cause for beatification is currently underway, having been declared Servant of God by Pope Benedict XVI.
- Esteban Pichay Villanueva (d. 1878) was the painter of the fourteen scenes of the Basi Revolt of 1807 led by Pedro Mateo and Ambaristo. The said paintings are now declared a National Cultural Treasure and are displayed at the former Provincial Jail beside the Padre Burgos House, under the auspices of the National Museum of the Philippines - Ilocos.
- Juan de la Fuente y Yepes (1702-1757) was the Bishop who requested the see to be moved to Vigan from Cagayan that was granted a year after his death, in 1758. His remains were originally buried in the central nave of Binmaley Church in Pangasinan until 1995; as written on his final will to be buried in the cathedral, he was reburied on the right side room beside the main altar, where the other bishops were also buried.

Bishops of Nueva Segovia buried in the cathedral

- Francisco Pizaro de Orellana (1680-1683)
- Pedro Mejorada (1717-1719)
- Miguel Garcia de San Esteban, OP (1768-1779)
- Juan García Ruiz (1784-1796)
- Cayetano Pallás, OP (1806-1814)
- Vicente Barreiro y Perez, OSA (1848-1856)
- Juan Jose Aragones, OSA (1865-1872)
- Mariano Cuartero (1874-1887)
- Santiago C. Sancho, D.D. (1951-1966)
- Juan C. Sison, D.D. (1966-1981)
- Edmundo Abaya, D.D. (1999-2005)

== Bibliography ==
- Dela Torre, Visitacion (2006). The Ilocos Heritage. Makati City: Tower Book House. ISBN 978-971-91030-9-7.
- Historical Markers: Regions I-IV and CAR (in Filipino). Manila: National Historical Institute (Philippines). 1993. p. 88. ISBN 971-538-061-1.
