= Juan de Mañozca y Zamora =

Spanish Roman Catholic prelate

Most Reverend Juan de Mañozca y Zamora
- Archbishop of Mexico
- Church: Catholic Church
- Archdiocese: Archdiocese of Mexico
- In office: 1643–1650
- Predecessor: Feliciano de la Vega Padilla
- Successor: Marcelo Lopez de Azcona

Orders
- Consecration: 24 Feb 1645 by Juan de Palafox y Mendoza

Personal details
- Born: 1580 Markina, Spain
- Died: 12 December 1650 (age 70) Mexico City

Juan de Mañozca y Zamora (1580 – 12 December 1650) was a Roman Catholic prelate who served as Archbishop of Mexico (1643–1650).

== Biography ==
Juan de Mañozca y Zamora was born in Markina, Spain. On 14 Jul 1643, he was selected by the King of Spain and confirmed by Pope Urban VIII on 16 Nov 1643 as Archbishop of Mexico. On 24 Feb 1645, he was consecrated bishop by Juan de Palafox y Mendoza, Bishop of Tlaxcala with Fernando Montero Espinosa, Bishop of Nueva Segovia serving as co-consecrator. He served as Archbishop of Mexico until his death on 12 Dec 1650. While bishop, he was the principal consecrator of Miguel de Poblete Casasola, Archbishop of Manila (1650).

== External links and additional sources ==
- Cheney, David M. "Archdiocese of México". Catholic-Hierarchy.org. (for Chronology of Bishops) ^{[self-published]}
- Chow, Gabriel. "Metropolitan Archdiocese of México". GCatholic.org. (for Chronology of Bishops) ^{[self-published]}

Catholic Church titles
Preceded by Feliciano de la Vega Padilla	Archbishop of Mexico; 1643–1650	Succeeded by Marcelo Lopez de Azcona
