= Hernando Guerrero =

The Most Reverend Hernando Guerrero O.S.A.
- Archbishop of Manila
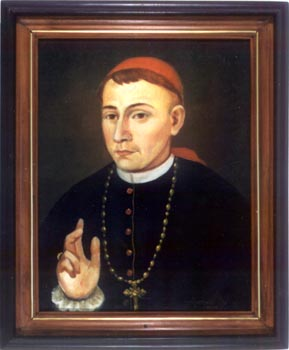
- Church: Catholic Church
- Diocese: Roman Catholic Archdiocese of Manila
- Predecessor: Miguel García Serrano
- Successor: Fernando Montero Espinosa
- Previous post: Bishop of Nueva Segovia

Orders
- Consecration: 1628 by Pedro de Arce

Personal details
- Born: 1572 Alcaraz, Spain
- Died: July 1, 1641 (age 69)

Hernando Guerrero, O.S.A. (1572 – July 1, 1641) was the Archbishop of the Catholic Archdiocese of Manila (1634–1641) and the Bishop of the Diocese of Nueva Segovia (1628–1634).

== Biography ==
Hernando Guerrero was born in Alcaraz, Spain and was an ordained priest of the Order of Saint Augustine.

On December 17, 1626, Urban VIII appointed him Bishop of Nueva Segovia. He was consecrated bishop in 1628 by Pedro de Arce, Bishop of Cebu. On January 9, 1634, Urban VIII appointed him Archbishop of Manila where he served until his death on July 1, 1641. While bishop, he was the Principal Consecrator of Diego Aduarte, Bishop of Nueva Segovia (1635).

== External links and additional sources ==
- Cheney, David M. "Archdiocese of Manila". Catholic-Hierarchy.org. (for Chronology of Bishops) ^{[self-published]}
- Chow, Gabriel. "Metropolitan Archdiocese of Manila". GCatholic.org. (for Chronology of Bishops) ^{[self-published]}

Catholic Church titles
Preceded by Juan Rentería	Bishop of Nueva Segovia; 1628–1634	Succeeded by Diego Aduarte
Preceded by Diego Vázquez de Mercado	Archbishop of Manila; 1634–1641	Succeeded by Fernando Montero Espinosa
