= Miguel de Poblete Casasola =

Spanish Roman Catholic prelate

Most Reverend Miguel de Poblete Casasola
- Archbishop of Manila
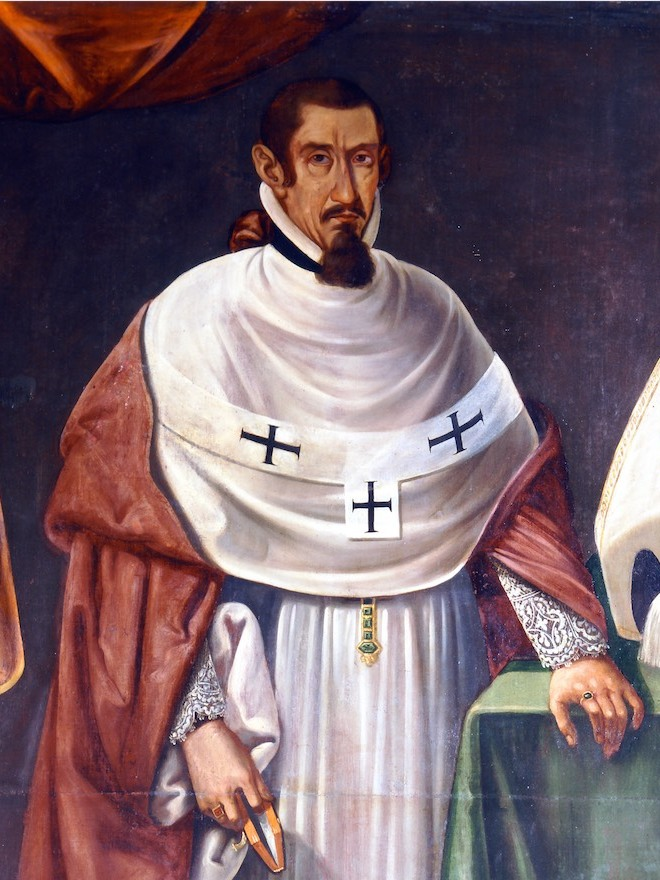
- Church: Catholic Church
- Diocese: Roman Catholic Archdiocese of Manila
- In office: 1649–1667
- Predecessor: Fernando Montero Espinosa
- Successor: Juan López
- Previous post: Bishop of Nicaragua & Costa Rica (1640)

Orders
- Consecration: September 9, 1650 by Juan de Mañozca y Zamora

Personal details
- Born: 1602 Mexico City, Viceroy of New Spain
- Died: December 8, 1667 (aged 64–65) Manila, Captaincy General of the Philippines

Miguel de Poblete Casasola or Miguel Millán de Poblete (1602 – December 8, 1667) was a Roman Catholic prelate who served as Bishop of Nicaragua (1640) and Archbishop of Manila (1649–1667).

== Biography ==
Miguel de Poblete Casasola was born in Mexico City. In 1640, he was appointed Bishop of Nicaragua but resigned before he could be consecrated. On May 20, 1648, Pope Innocent X appointed him Archbishop of Manila. On January 1, 1649, he was confirmed to the position and on September 9, 1650, he was consecrated bishop by Juan de Mañozca y Zamora, Archbishop of Mexico. He served as Archbishop of Manila until his death on December 8, 1667. While bishop, he was the Principal Consecrator of Nicolás de la Torre Muñoz, Bishop of Santiago de Cuba (1651); and Rodrigo Cárdenas, Bishop of Nueva Segovia (1651).

His nephew was José Millán de Poblete, Bishop-elect of Nueva Segovia.

== External links and additional sources ==
- Cheney, David M. "Diocese of León en Nicaragua". Catholic-Hierarchy.org. (for Chronology of Bishops) ^{[self-published]}
- Chow, Gabriel. "Diocese of León (Nicaragua)". GCatholic.org. (for Chronology of Bishops) ^{[self-published]}
- Cheney, David M. "Archdiocese of Manila". Catholic-Hierarchy.org. (for Chronology of Bishops) ^{[self-published]}
- Chow, Gabriel. "Metropolitan Archdiocese of Manila". GCatholic.org. (for Chronology of Bishops) ^{[self-published]}

Religious titles
| Preceded by Fernando Núñez Sagredo | Bishop of Nicaragua and Costa Rica; 1640 | Succeeded by Alonso de Briceño |
| Preceded by Fernando Montero Espinosa | Archbishop of Manila; 1649–1667 | Succeeded by Juan López |
