= Domingo de la Anunciación =

Spanish Dominican missionary

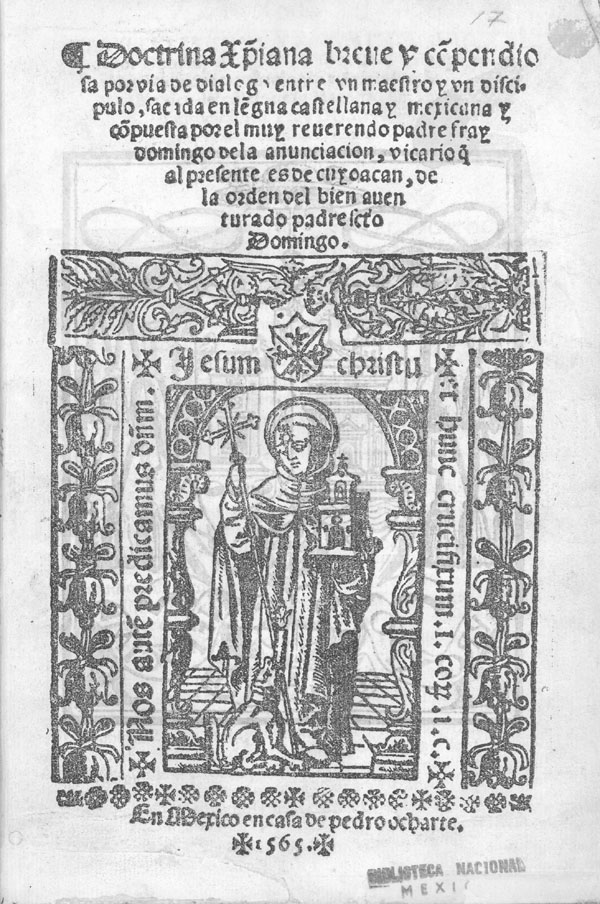
- The title page of Domingo de la Anunciación's Doctrina cristiana.
- Born: Juan de Ecija (or Ecía); 1510; Fuente Ovejuna
- Died: 1591 (aged 80–81)
- Occupation: Spanish Dominican missionary in New Spain

Domingo de la Anunciación (1510–1591), born Juan de Ecija (also spelled as Ecía), was a Spanish Dominican missionary in New Spain (now Mexico).

== Biography ==
He was born in Fuente Obejuna as Juan de Ecija. At the age of 13, he requested to be admitted to the Order of St. Francis, but was denied. His father, Hernando de Ecija, died in 1528, and Juan and his elder brother Hernando de Paz moved to New Spain. There, Hernando became a secretary to the Royal Audiencia of Mexico. Juan became a member of the Dominican Order and assumed his new name Domingo de la Anunciación.

Domingo was considered of the most zealous instructors of the Mexican Indians. During the epidemic of 1545, he went from village to village to attend the natives.

In 1559, Domingo de la Anunciación, Domingo de Salazar, and a lay brother joined Tristán de Luna y Arellano on his expedition to southwestern Florida. The group traveled near to what is now the Caloosahatchee River, where they were shipwrecked and deprived of resources.

After de la Anunciación returned to Mexico, he returned to Mexico to continue teaching. In 1565 he published his only known work, a book of Christian doctrine in Spanish and Nahuatl entitled Doctrina cristiana breve y compendiosa por vía de diálogo entre un maestro y un discípulo.

In 1585, Domingo became blind and retired from teaching; he died in 1591. After his brother's death, Herando de Paz became a Dominican and a member of the order.

Diego Aduarte mentioned de la Anunciación in one of his works. Agustín Dávila Padilla also wrote about him.
