= Azcona (surname) =

Azcona is a Basque surname and the Castilianized form of Azkona. Notable people with the surname include:

- Abel Azcona (born 1988), Spanish artist
- Edison Azcona (born 2003), Dominican-American footballer
- Elizabeth Azcona Bocock (born 1969), Honduran politician
- Elizabeth Azcona Cranwell (1933–2004), Argentine poet
- José Azcona Bocock (born 1972), Honduran businessman and politician
- José Azcona del Hoyo (1927–2005), president of Honduras from 1986 to 1990
- Marcelo López de Azcona (died 1653), Spanish Catholic prelate
- Melchor de Mediavilla y Azcona, the acting governor of Texas between 1727 and 1731
- Mikel Azcona (born 1996), Spanish auto racing driver
- Librado Azcona (born 1984), Paraguayan footballer
- Rafael Azcona (1926–2008), Spanish screenwriter and novelist
