= Michael Fitzwalter =

Most Reverend Michael Fitzwalter
- Auxiliary Bishop of Seville
- Church: Catholic Church
- Diocese: Diocese of Ardfert and Aghadoe
- In office: 1591–1601
- Previous post: Auxiliary Bishop of Seville (1596-1601)

Personal details
- Born: Ireland
- Died: 1601 Alcala del Rio

Michael Fitzwalter (also Miguel Gualtero)(died 1601) was a Roman Catholic prelate who served as Auxiliary Bishop of Seville (1596–1601). He was also named Bishop of Ardfert and Aghadoe (1591-1601) but never assumed the bishopric.

== Biography ==
Michael Fitzwalter was born in Ireland. On 9 August 1591, Michael Fitzwalter was appointed by Pope Gregory XIV as Bishop of Ardfert and Aghadoe and consecrated in Venice on 15 August 1591. Although appointed Bishop of Ardfert and Aghadoe, he never returned to Ireland and the diocese was administered by Vicars Apostolic in his absence.

He has been associated with the English College of St Gregory in Seville, Spain. While bishop, he was the principal co-consecrator of Antonio de Raya Navarrete, Bishop of Cuzco (1594). In 1596, he was appointed by Pope Clement VIII as Auxiliary Bishop of Seville where he served until his death at Alcala del Rio, Spain in 1601.

== External links and additional sources ==
- Cheney, David M. "Archdiocese of Sevilla {Seville}". Catholic-Hierarchy.org. (for Chronology of Bishops) ^{[self-published]}
- Chow, Gabriel. "Metropolitan Archdiocese of Sevilla (Italy)". GCatholic.org. (for Chronology of Bishops) ^{[self-published]}
