= Miguel García Serrano =

Spanish Roman Catholic prelate

The Most Reverend Miguel García Serrano O.S.A.
- Archbishop of Manila
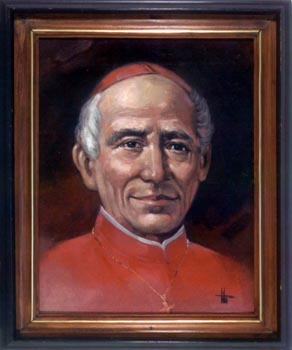
- Church: Catholic Church
- Diocese: Roman Catholic Archdiocese of Manila
- In office: 1618–1629
- Predecessor: Diego Vázquez de Mercado
- Successor: Hernando Guerrero
- Previous post: Bishop of Nueva Segovia (1616–1618)

Orders
- Ordination: 1592
- Consecration: 1617 by Juan Pérez de la Serna

Personal details
- Born: 1569 Chinchón, Spain
- Died: June 14, 1629 (age 60)

Miguel García Serrano, O.S.A. (1569 – June 14, 1629) was a Roman Catholic prelate who served as the Archbishop of the Roman Catholic Archdiocese of Manila (1618–1629) and the Bishop of the Diocese of Nueva Segovia (1616–1618).

== Biography ==
Miguel García Serrano was born in Chinchón, Spain and ordained a priest of the Order of Saint Augustine in 1592. On August 3, 1616, Pope Paul V appointed him Bishop of Nueva Segovia. In 1617, he was consecrated bishop by Juan Pérez de la Serna, Archbishop of México. On February 12, 1618, Pope Paul V appointed him Archbishop of Manila. During his episcopacy, Serrano ordained Augustin Tabuyo to the priesthood on December 18, 1621, likely making Tabuyo the first Filipino to become a priest on record. Serrano served as archbishop until his death on June 14, 1629.

== See also ==
- Catholic Church in the Philippines

== External links and additional sources ==
- Cheney, David M. "Archdiocese of Manila". Catholic-Hierarchy.org. (for Chronology of Bishops) ^{[self-published]}
- Chow, Gabriel. "Metropolitan Archdiocese of Manila". GCatholic.org. (for Chronology of Bishops) ^{[self-published]}

Religious titles
Preceded by Diego Soria	Bishop of Nueva Segovia; 1616–1618	Succeeded by Juan Rentería
Preceded by Diego Vázquez de Mercado	Archbishop of Manila; 1618–1629	Succeeded by Hernando Guerrero
