= Juan de Izquierdo =

Most Reverend Juan de Izquierdo
- Bishop of Yucatán
- Church: Catholic Church
- In office: 1588–1602
- Predecessor: Gregorio de Montalvo Olivera
- Successor: Diego Vázquez de Mercado

Personal details
- Died: 17 November 1602 Mérida, Yucatán, Mexico

Juan de Izquierdo, O.F.M. (died 17 November 1602) was a Roman Catholic prelate who served as Bishop of Yucatán (1588–1602).

== Biography ==
Juan de Izquierdo was ordained a priest in the Order of Friars Minor. On 13 June 1588, he was appointed during the papacy of Pope Clement VIII as Bishop of Yucatán. He served as Bishop of Yucatán until his death on 17 November 1602.

== External links and additional sources ==
- Cheney, David M. "Archdiocese of Yucatán". Catholic-Hierarchy.org. (for Chronology of Bishops) ^{[self-published]}
- Chow, Gabriel. "Metropolitan Archdiocese of Yucatán". GCatholic.org. (for Chronology of Bishops) ^{[self-published]}

Catholic Church titles
Preceded by Gregorio de Montalvo Olivera	Bishop of Yucatán; 1588–1602	Succeeded by Diego Vázquez de Mercado
