= Rodrigo Cárdenas =

Most Reverend Rodrigo Cárdenas
- Bishop of Nueva Segovia
- Church: Catholic Church
- Diocese: Diocese of Nueva Segovia
- In office: 1650–1661
- Predecessor: Fernando Montero Espinosa
- Successor: José Millán de Poblete

Orders
- Consecration: 28 May 1651 by Miguel de Poblete Casasola

Personal details
- Died: May 1661 Vigan, Philippines

Rodrigo Cárdenas, O.P. (died 1661) was a Roman Catholic prelate who served as Bishop of Nueva Segovia (1650–1661).

== Biography ==
Rodrigo Cárdenas was ordained a priest in the Order of Preachers. On 30 May 1650, he was appointed during the papacy of Pope Innocent X as Bishop of Nueva Segovia. On 28 May 1651, he was consecrated bishop by Miguel de Poblete Casasola, Archbishop of Manila. On 22 Jul 1653, he was installed as Bishop of Nueva Segovia. He served as Bishop of Nueva Segovia until his death in May 1661. While bishop, he was the principal co-consecrator of Juan Merlo de la Fuente, Bishop of Comayagua (1651).

Catholic Church titles
Preceded by Fernando Montero Espinosa	Bishop of Nueva Segovia; 1650–1661	Succeeded by José Millán de Poblete
