= Fernando Montero Espinosa =

Archbishop of Manila

Most Reverend Fernando Montero Espinosa
- Archbishop-elect of Manila
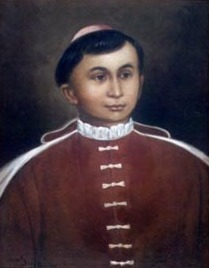
- Church: Catholic Church
- Diocese: Roman Catholic Archdiocese of Manila
- Predecessor: Hernando Guerrero
- Successor: Miguel de Poblete Casasola
- Previous post: Bishop of Nueva Segovia (1639–1644)

Orders
- Consecration: February 3, 1640 by Juan de Palafox y Mendoza

Personal details
- Born: Madrid
- Died: 1645 Pila, Laguna Philippines

Fernando Montero Espinosa Archbishop-elect of Manila (1644-1645), secular priest of Burgos, became first chaplain of the Royal Chapel of Philip IV. Consecrated bishop in Mexico in 1643 for Nueva Segovia, then appointed Archbishop of Manila in 1644. His installation never took place for he died in Pila, Laguna on his way to Manila in 1645.

== Biography ==
On July 16, 1639, he was selected by the King of Spain and confirmed by Pope Urban VIII as Bishop of Nueva Segovia. On February 3, 1640, he was consecrated bishop by Juan de Palafox y Mendoza, Bishop of Tlaxcala.

Death of the Archbishop (from The Philippine Islands, 1493-1898, Volume XXXV)

In July the two galleons, "Encarnacion" and "Rosario," arrived at the port of Lampon, on the coast opposite Manila, with abundance of aid from Nueva España, carefully provided by his Majesty (whom God preserve) on account of the information received by his royal Council regarding the reenforcements that were going from Olanda against these islands. With these galleons came his Lordship Don Fernando Montero de Espinosa, bishop of Nueva Segovia and archbishop-elect of Manila; he was a prelate of promise and ability, as is known to the [Spanish] court. Heaven did not will that Manila should enjoy his presence, or merit seeing him alive, but only when he was dead; for even while all the people were preparing a magnificent reception for him, with suitable festivities and rejoicings, they were called upon for tears and mourning in solemnizing his funeral rites. His illustrious Lordship reached the port with poor health. The land-routes which they had to take in traveling from Lampon to the lake [of Bay] and the river of Manila are very rough and steep, without any convenience or comfort of inns. His illustrious Lordship, by making the journey easier for others through his charity, traveled through those mountains so destitute of comforts that on the same day when he reached the lake he became seriously ill. He would not allow them to bleed him, and on that very night he was attacked by a hemorrhage of blood, so abundant that it caused his death. On the morning of the next day, a crowd of handsomely adorned boats awaited him at the mouth of the Manila [i.e., Pasig] River; they looked like a garden of flowers, and contained musicians who played their instruments together. But they received his venerated body, with the trappings of grief, and with mournful lamentations.

== Episcopal succession ==
While bishop, he was the Principal co-consecrator of:

- Antonio Guzmán Cornejo, Bishop of Tui (1640);
- Domingo Ramírez de Arellano, Bishop of Chiapas (1641);
- Pedro Tapia, Bishop of Segovia (1641);
- Pedro Rosales Encio, Bishop of Lugo (1641);
- José de Argáiz Pérez, Bishop of Almería (1642); and
- Juan de Mañozca y Zamora, Archbishop of México (1645).

== External links and additional sources ==
- Cheney, David M. "Archdiocese of Manila". Catholic-Hierarchy.org. (for Chronology of Bishops) ^{[self-published]}
- Chow, Gabriel. "Metropolitan Archdiocese of Manila". GCatholic.org. (for Chronology of Bishops) ^{[self-published]}

Religious titles
Preceded by Diego Aduarte	Bishop of Nueva Segovia; 1639–1646	Succeeded by Rodrigo Cárdenas
Preceded by Hernando Guerrero	Archbishop of Manila; 1646–1648	Succeeded by Miguel de Poblete Casasola
