= Ignacio Santibáñez =

Spanish Roman Catholic prelate

The Most Reverend Ignacio Santibáñez O.F.M.
- Archbishop of Manila
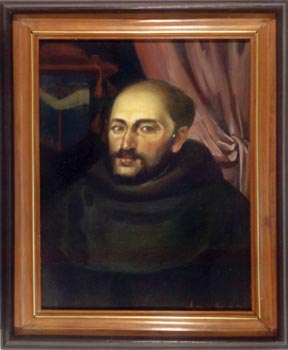
- Province: Manila
- See: Manila
- Installed: August 30, 1595
- Term ended: August 14, 1598
- Predecessor: Domingo de Salazar, O.P.
- Successor: Miguel de Benavides, O.P.

Orders
- Consecration: August 3, 1597 by Diego de Romano y Govea

Personal details
- Born: 1512
- Died: August 14, 1598 (aged 85–86) Manila, Captaincy General of the Philippines
- Denomination: Roman Catholic

Styles of Arzobispo Ignacio Santibáñez
- Reference style: Monseñor
- Spoken style: Su Excelencia Reverendísima
- Religious style: Reverendísimo

Ignacio Santibáñez (1512 – August 14, 1598) was a Roman Catholic prelate who served as the first Archbishop of Manila (1595–1598).

== Biography ==
On August 30, 1595, Ignacio Santibáñez was selected by the King of Spain and confirmed by Pope Clement VIII as the first Archbishop of Manila (second Bishop of the Diocese). On August 3, 1597, he was consecrated bishop by Diego de Romano y Govea, Bishop of Tlaxcala, and installed on May 28, 1598. He served as Archbishop of Manila until his death on August 14, 1598.

== External links and additional sources ==
- Cheney, David M. "Archdiocese of Manila". Catholic-Hierarchy.org. (for Chronology of Bishops) ^{[self-published]}
- Chow, Gabriel. "Metropolitan Archdiocese of Manila". GCatholic.org. (for Chronology of Bishops) ^{[self-published]}

Religious titles
Preceded by Domingo de Salazar	Archbishop of Manila; 1595–1598	Succeeded by Miguel de Benavides
