= José Millán de Poblete =

Mexican Roman Catholic prelate

Most Reverend José Millán de Poblete
- Bishop-elect of Nueva Segovia
- Church: Catholic Church
- Diocese: Diocese of Nueva Segovia
- In office: 1675–?
- Predecessor: Rodrigo Cárdenas
- Successor: Francisco Pizaro de Orellana

Personal details
- Born: 1635 Mexico City, New Spain
- Died: Unknown

José Millán de Poblete was a Roman Catholic prelate who served as Bishop-elect of Nueva Segovia (1675–?).

== Biography ==
José Millán de Poblete was born in Mexico in 1635, the nephew of Miguel Millán de Poblete, Archbishop of Manila. On 27 May 1675, he was appointed during the papacy of Pope Clement X as Bishop of Nueva Segovia. Records indicate that although he was less than 50 when appointed, he only served a short period and died before he was consecrated. The next bishop of record is Francisco Pizaro de Orellana who was selected in 1680.

Religious titles
Preceded by Rodrigo Cárdenas	Bishop-elect of Nueva Segovia; 1675–?	Succeeded by Francisco Pizaro de Orellana
