= Juan Rentería =

Most Reverend Juan de Rentería
- Bishop of Nueva Segovia
- Church: Catholic Church
- Diocese: Diocese of Nueva Segovia
- In office: 1618–1626
- Predecessor: Miguel García Serrano
- Successor: Hernando Guerrero

Personal details
- Born: c. 1560 Guadalajara, Nueva Galicia, Viceroyalty of New Spain
- Died: 1626 Vigan, Philippines

Juan de Rentería (died 1626) was a Roman Catholic prelate who served as the fourth Bishop of Nueva Segovia (1618–1626).

== Biography ==
Juan de Rentería was born in Guadalajara, Mexico. On 5 March 1618, he was appointed during the papacy of Pope Paul V as Bishop of Nueva Segovia. He served as Bishop of Nueva Segovia until his death in 1626.

Catholic Church titles
Preceded by Miguel García Serrano	Bishop of Nueva Segovia; 1618–1626	Succeeded by Hernando Guerrero
