= Diego Soria =

Spanish prelate (??–1613)

Most Reverend Diego Soria
- Bishop of Nueva Segovia
- Church: Catholic Church
- Diocese: Diocese of Nueva Segovia
- In office: 1602–1613
- Predecessor: Miguel de Benavides
- Successor: Miguel García Serrano

Orders
- Consecration: 1603

Personal details
- Born: Yébenes, Spain
- Died: 1613 Vigan, Philippines

Diego Soria y Lerma Polanco, O.P. (died 1613) was a Roman Catholic prelate who served as the second Bishop of Nueva Segovia (1602–1613).

== Biography ==
Diego Soria was born in Yébenes, Spain and ordained a priest in the Order of Preachers. On 15 November 1602, he was appointed during the papacy of Pope Clement VIII as Bishop of Nueva Segovia. In 1603, he was consecrated bishop. He served as Bishop of Nueva Segovia until his death in 1613.

Catholic Church titles
Preceded by Miguel de Benavides	Bishop of Nueva Segovia; 1602–1613	Succeeded by Miguel García Serrano
