= Diego de Gorospe e Irala =

Spanish Roman Catholic prelate

Most Reverend Diego de Gorospe e Irala
- Bishop of Nueva Segovia
- Church: Catholic Church
- In office: 1699–1715
- Predecessor: Francisco Pizaro de Orellana
- Successor: Pedro Mejorada

Orders
- Consecration: 22 January 1702 by García Felipe de Legazpi y Velasco Altamirano y Albornoz

Personal details
- Born: 1649 Puebla, New Spain (now Mexico)
- Died: 20 May 1715 (age 66) Vigan, Captaincy General of the Philippines

Diego de Gorospe e Irala, O.P. (1649–1715) was a Roman Catholic prelate who served as Bishop of Nueva Segovia (1699–1715).

== Biography ==
Diego de Gorospe e Irala was born in Puebla, New Spain (now in Mexico), in 1649 and ordained a priest in the Order of Preachers. On 1 June 1699, he was appointed during the papacy of Pope Innocent XII as Bishop of Nueva Segovia but did not arrive in the diocese until 1704. His appointment filled a long vacancy in the bishopric as his predecessor died in 1683.

On 22 January 1702, he was consecrated bishop by García Felipe de Legazpi y Velasco Altamirano y Albornoz, Bishop of Michoacán. He served as Bishop of Nueva Segovia until his death on 20 May 1715.

Catholic Church titles
Preceded by Francisco Pizaro de Orellana	Bishop of Nueva Segovia; 1699–1715	Succeeded by Pedro Mejorada
