= Gregorio de Montalvo Olivera =

Spanish Roman Catholic prelate

Most Reverend Gregorio de Montalvo Olivera
- Bishop of Cuzco
- Church: Catholic Church
- Diocese: Diocese of Cusco
- In office: 1587–1592
- Predecessor: Sebastián Lartaún
- Successor: Antonio de Raya Navarrete
- Previous post: Bishop of Yucatán (1580–1581)

Personal details
- Born: 1529 Coca, Segovia, Spain
- Died: 11 December 1592 (age 63) Cuzco, Peru

Gregorio de Montalvo Olivera, O.P. (1529 – 11 December 1592) was a Roman Catholic prelate who served as Bishop of Cuzco (1587–1592) and Bishop of Yucatán (1580–1581).

== Biography ==
He was born in Coca, Segovia, Spain, and ordained a priest in the Order of Preachers.

On 15 December 1580, he was appointed during the papacy of Pope Gregory XIII as Bishop of Yucatán, and was accordingly consecrated in 1581. In 1585, he attended the Third Mexican Provincial Council.

On 16 November 1587, he was appointed during the papacy of Pope Sixtus V as Bishop of Cuzco. He served as Bishop of Cuzco until his death, on 11 December 1592.

== External links and additional sources ==
- Cheney, David M. "Archdiocese of Yucatán". Catholic-Hierarchy.org. (for Chronology of Bishops) ^{[self-published]}
- Chow, Gabriel. "Metropolitan Archdiocese of Yucatán". GCatholic.org. (for Chronology of Bishops) ^{[self-published]}
- Cheney, David M. "Archdiocese of Cuzco". Catholic-Hierarchy.org. (for Chronology of Bishops) ^{[self-published]}
- Chow, Gabriel. "Metropolitan Archdiocese of Cusco (Peru)". GCatholic.org. (for Chronology of Bishops) ^{[self-published]}

Catholic Church titles
Preceded by Diego de Landa	Bishop of Yucatán; 1580–1581	Succeeded by Juan de Izquierdo
Preceded by Sebastián Lartaún	Bishop of Cuzco; 1587–1592	Succeeded by Antonio de Raya Navarrete
