= Antonio de Raya Navarrete =

Spanish Roman Catholic prelate

Most Reverend Antonio de Raya Navarrete
- Bishop of Cusco
- Church: Catholic Church
- Diocese: Diocese of Cusco
- In office: 1594–1606
- Predecessor: Gregorio de Montalvo Olivera
- Successor: Fernando Mendoza González

Orders
- Consecration: 27 November 1594 by Pedro Castro Quiñones

Personal details
- Born: 1536 Baeza, Spain
- Died: 28 July 1606 (aged 69–70) Cuzco Peru

Antonio de Raya Navarrete (1536 – 28 July 1606) was a Roman Catholic prelate who served as Bishop of Cuzco (1594–1606).

== Life and career ==
Antonio de Raya Navarrete was born in Baeza, Spain. On 6 June 1594, he was selected by the King of Spain and confirmed by Pope Clement VIII as Bishop of Cusco. On 27 November 1594, he was consecrated bishop by Pedro Castro Quiñones, Archbishop of Granada with Juan Fonseca, Bishop of Guadix, and Michael Fitzwalter serving as co-consecrators. He served as Bishop of Cusco until his death on 28 July 1606.

== External links and additional sources ==
- Cheney, David M. "Archdiocese of Cuzco". Catholic-Hierarchy.org. (for Chronology of Bishops) ^{[self-published]}
- Chow, Gabriel. "Metropolitan Archdiocese of Cusco (Peru)". GCatholic.org. (for Chronology of Bishops) ^{[self-published]}

Catholic Church titles
Preceded by Gregorio de Montalvo Olivera	Bishop of Cusco; 1594–1606	Succeeded by Fernando Mendoza González
