= Francisco Pizaro de Orellana =

Bishop of Nueva Segovia (1680–1683)

Most Reverend Francisco Pizaro de Orellana
- Bishop of Nueva Segovia
- Church: Catholic Church
- Diocese: Diocese of Nueva Segovia
- In office: 1680–1683
- Predecessor: José Millán de Poblete
- Successor: Diego de Gorospe e Irala

Orders
- Consecration: 1681

Personal details
- Born: 1630 Manila, Captaincy General of the Philippines
- Died: 2 September 1683 (age 53) Vigan, Captaincy General of the Philippines

Francisco Pizaro de Orellana (1630–1683) was a Roman Catholic prelate who served as Bishop of Nueva Segovia (1680–1683).

== Biography ==
Francisco Pizaro de Orellana was born in Manila, Spanish East Indies (now in the Philippines), in 1630 and served as Archdeacon of Manila and commissary of the Holy Crusade. On 22 February 1680, he was selected by the King of Spain as Bishop of Nueva Segovia and confirmed by Pope Innocent XI on 27 May 1680 in Vigan. In 1681, he was consecrated bishop. He served as Bishop of Nueva Segovia until his death on 2 September 1683. His death caused a long vacancy of the bishopric in the diocese with his successor not appointed until 1699 and not arriving until 1704.

Catholic Church titles
Preceded by José Millán de Poblete	Bishop of Nueva Segovia; 1680–1683	Succeeded by Diego de Gorospe e Irala
