= Diego Vázquez de Mercado =

Spanish Roman Catholic prelate

The Most Reverend Diego Vázquez de Mercado
- Archbishop of Manila
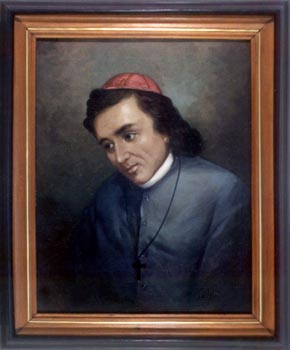
- Church: Catholic Church
- Diocese: Roman Catholic Archdiocese of Manila
- Predecessor: Miguel de Benavides
- Successor: Miguel García Serrano
- Previous post: Bishop of Yucatán (1603–1604)

Orders
- Consecration: June 13, 1604 by García de Santa María Mendoza y Zúñiga

Personal details
- Born: 1533 Alcaraz, Spain
- Died: June 12, 1616 (aged 82–83) Manila, Philippines

Diego Vázquez de Mercado (1533 – June 12, 1616) was a Roman Catholic prelate who served as the Archbishop of the Roman Catholic Archdiocese of Manila (1608–1616) and the Bishop of the Diocese of Yucatán (1604–1608).

== Biography ==
Diego Vázquez de Mercado was born in Alcaraz, Spain. At some point in time, he had tried to request admission into the Society of Jesus as a priest and as the dean of the cathedral chapter of Manila. On November 5, 1603, Pope Clement VIII appointed him Bishop of Yucatán, Mexico. He was consecrated bishop on June 13, 1604, by García de Santa María Mendoza y Zúñiga, Archbishop of México. May 28, 1608, Pope Paul V appointed him Archbishop of Manila.

While Archbishop, he was the principal consecrator of Pedro de Arce, Bishop of Cebu (1613), and principal co-consecrator of Alonso de Peralta, Archbishop of La Plata o Charcas (1609).

== External links and additional sources ==
- Cheney, David M. "Archdiocese of Yucatán". Catholic-Hierarchy.org. (for Chronology of Bishops) ^{[self-published]}
- Chow, Gabriel. "Metropolitan Archdiocese of Yucatán". GCatholic.org. (for Chronology of Bishops) ^{[self-published]}
- Cheney, David M. "Archdiocese of Manila". Catholic-Hierarchy.org. (for Chronology of Bishops) ^{[self-published]}
- Chow, Gabriel. "Metropolitan Archdiocese of Manila". GCatholic.org. (for Chronology of Bishops) ^{[self-published]}

Religious titles
Preceded by Juan de Izquierdo	Bishop of Yucatán; 1603–1604	Succeeded by Gonzalo de Salazar (bishop)
Preceded by Miguel de Benavides	Archbishop of Manila; 1608–1616	Succeeded by Miguel García Serrano
