= Juan García Ruiz =

Roman Catholic prelate

Most Reverend Juan García Ruiz, OAR
- Bishop of Nueva Segovia
- Church: Catholic Church
- Diocese: Diocese of Nueva Segovia
- In office: 1784–1796
- Predecessor: Miguel García San Esteban
- Successor: Agustín Pedro Blaquier

Orders
- Consecration: 12 March 1786 by Juan Antonio Gallego y Orbigo

Personal details
- Born: 6 June 1728 Madridejo Plasencia, Spain
- Died: 2 May 1796 (age 67) Nueva Segovia, Philippines

Juan García Ruiz, OAR (6 June 1728 – 2 May 1796) was a Roman Catholic prelate who served as Bishop of Nueva Segovia from 1784 to 1796.

== Biography ==
Juan García Ruiz was born in Madridejos, Plasencia, Spain on 6 June 1728. On 25 June 1784, he was appointed as Bishop of Nueva Segovia during the papacy of Pope Pius VI. On 12 March 1786, he was consecrated bishop by Juan Antonio Gallego y Orbigo, Bishop of Nueva Caceres. He served as Bishop of Nueva Segovia until his death on 2 May 1796.

Catholic Church titles
Preceded by Miguel García San Esteban	Bishop of Nueva Segovia; 1784–1796	Succeeded by Agustín Pedro Blaquier
