= San Pablo de la Moraleja =

Coordinates: 41°10′N 4°46′W

San Pablo de la Moraleja, Spain
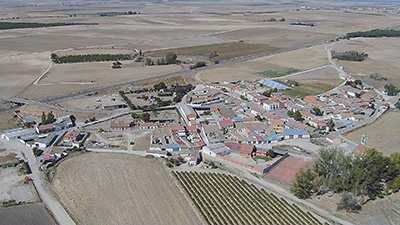
- Aerial view of San Pablo de la Moraleja (Valladolid, España).
- Interactive map of San Pablo de la Moraleja, Spain
- Country: Spain
- Autonomous community: Castile and León
- Province: Valladolid
- Municipality: San Pablo de la Moraleja

Area
  - Total: 24 km^{2} (9.3 sq mi)

Population (2025-01-01)
  - Total: 113
  - Density: 4.7/km^{2} (12/sq mi)
- Time zone: UTC+1 (CET)
  - Summer (DST): UTC+2 (CEST)

San Pablo de la Moraleja is a municipality located in the province of Valladolid, Castile and León, Spain. According to the 2004 census (INE), the municipality has a population of 167 inhabitants.
