= Marcelo López de Azcona =

Spanish Catholic prelate

Most Reverend Marcelo López de Azcona
- Archbishop of Mexico
- Church: Catholic Church
- Archdiocese: Archdiocese of Mexico
- In office: 1651–1653
- Predecessor: Juan de Mañozca y Zamora
- Successor: Mateo de Sagade de Bugueyro

Orders
- Consecration: 25 July 1653 by Juan Merlo de la Fuente

Personal details
- Died: 10 November 1653 Mexico City, New Spain

Marcelo López de Azcona (died 10 November 1653) was a Spanish Catholic prelate who served as Archbishop of Mexico (1651–1653).

== Biography ==
On 31 December 1651, Marcelo López de Azcona was selected by the King of Spain and confirmed by Pope Innocent X on 29 April 1652 as Archbishop of Mexico. On 25 July 1653, he was consecrated bishop by Juan Merlo de la Fuente, Bishop of Comayagua. He served as Archbishop of Mexico until his death on 10 November 1653. While bishop, he was the principal consecrator of Juan Garcilaso de la Vega, Bishop of Santiago de Guatemala (1653).

== External links and additional sources ==
- Cheney, David M. "Archdiocese of México". Catholic-Hierarchy.org. (for Chronology of Bishops) ^{[self-published]}
- Chow, Gabriel. "Metropolitan Archdiocese of México". GCatholic.org. (for Chronology of Bishops) ^{[self-published]}

Catholic Church titles
Preceded by Juan de Mañozca y Zamora	Archbishop of Mexico; 1651–1653	Succeeded by Mateo de Sagade de Bugueyro
