= Diego Aduarte =

Spanish Dominican friar, missionary and historian

Diego Aduarte OP (1570–1636; born in Zaragoza) was a Spanish Dominican friar and historian. He was a missionary to the Philippine Islands and arrived there in 1595 with Blancas de San Jose. In 1632 was made Prior of Manila. He died in 1636.

Aduarte's works include an account of the difficulties and problems faced by Spanish missionaries introducing Christianity into Cambodia. He also made a biography of the missionary Juan Cobo.

Religious titles
Preceded by Hernando Guerrero	Bishop of Nueva Segovia; 1634–1636	Succeeded by Fernando Montero Espinosa
