= Domingo de Salazar =

16th-century Catholic prelate; first Bishop of Manila (1579–94)

The Most Reverend Domingo de Salazar O.P.
- Bishop of Manila
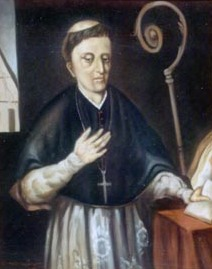
- Portrait from the Manila Cathedral
- Province: Manila
- See: Manila
- Installed: February 6, 1579
- Term ended: December 4, 1594
- Predecessor: None
- Successor: Ignacio Santibáñez, O.F.M.

Personal details
- Born: c. 1512 Labastida, Crown of Castile
- Died: December 4, 1594 (aged 81–82) Madrid, Crown of Castile
- Denomination: Catholic

Styles of Obispo Domingo de Salazar
- Reference style: Monseñor
- Spoken style: Su Excelencia Reverendísima
- Religious style: Reverendísimo

Domingo de Salazar (1512 – December 4, 1594) was a Catholic Dominican prelate who served as the first Bishop of Manila (1579–1594), which was then newly-annexed to the Spanish Empire.

Salazar vocally opposed the mistreatment and enslavement of Philippine natives by Spanish colonists.

== Biography ==
Domingo de Salazar was born in La Rioja, Spain. At the age of 15, his family sent him to study at the University of Salamanca, wherein the university was the most important cultural and intellectual center of Spain and one of the famous in the entire European continent. At the University of Salamanca, Salazar was profoundly influenced by the philosopher and theologian Francisco de Vitoria, wherein many of the solutions that Salazar tried to offer when it came to the theological and juridicial problems in the Philippines, were inspired by Vitoria. He obtained his bachelor's degree in Canon Law in the year 1532 and afterwards obtained his Bachelor of Civil Laws in 1539. There was no concrete evidence to point the idea that Salazar actually enrolled in the classes taught by Vitoria, but he supported the cause of Vitoria, the humanitarian and Christian ideas with regards to the conquest and evangelization of the Americas.

Salazar was also involved in the Spanish expedition in the modern-day US state of Florida from 1558 until 1561. After leaving Mexico City to Florida, Salazar, along with Pedro de Feria and Domingo de la Anunciación, wrote a letter to King Philip II that all laws enacted for the new discoveries and conquest had to be fulfilled by the participants in the expedition so that abuses against the natives would be avoided and there must be enough provisions that should be given to the expeditionaries for at least a period of time, so that robberies against the locals would be avoided.

On February 6, 1579, he was selected by the King of Spain and confirmed by Pope Gregory XIII as the first Bishop of Manila. He arrived in Manila on September 17, 1581. He strongly opposed the enslavement and mistreatment of the indigenous people of the Philippines by Spanish colonists, and was noted to have clashed with Governor-General Gonzalo Ronquillo de Peñalosa regarding the issue. He organized a council of theologians to discuss the issue of slavery, and arrived at the principle that "the freedom of the natives could not be deferred as it was a matter of natural and divine right and clear justice". Throughout his tenure as bishop, he corresponded with King Philip II to provide updates on the situation in Manila. He served as Bishop of Manila until his death on December 4, 1594, aged 82.

== Gallery ==
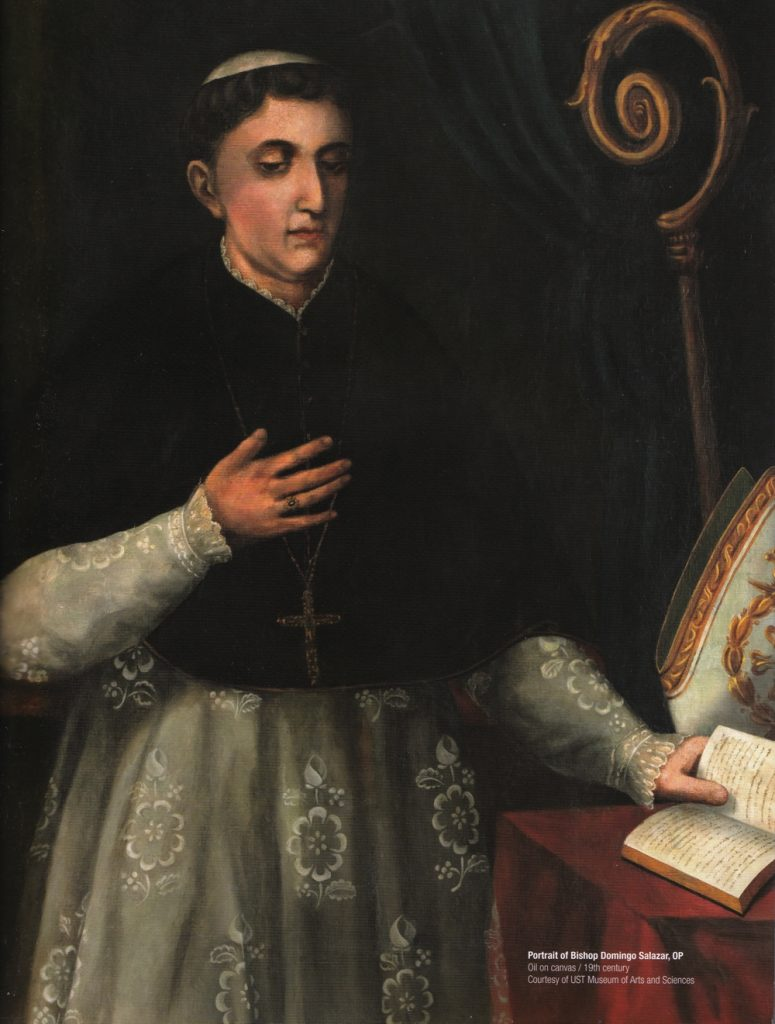
Posthumous 19th century portrait, from the University of Santo Tomas

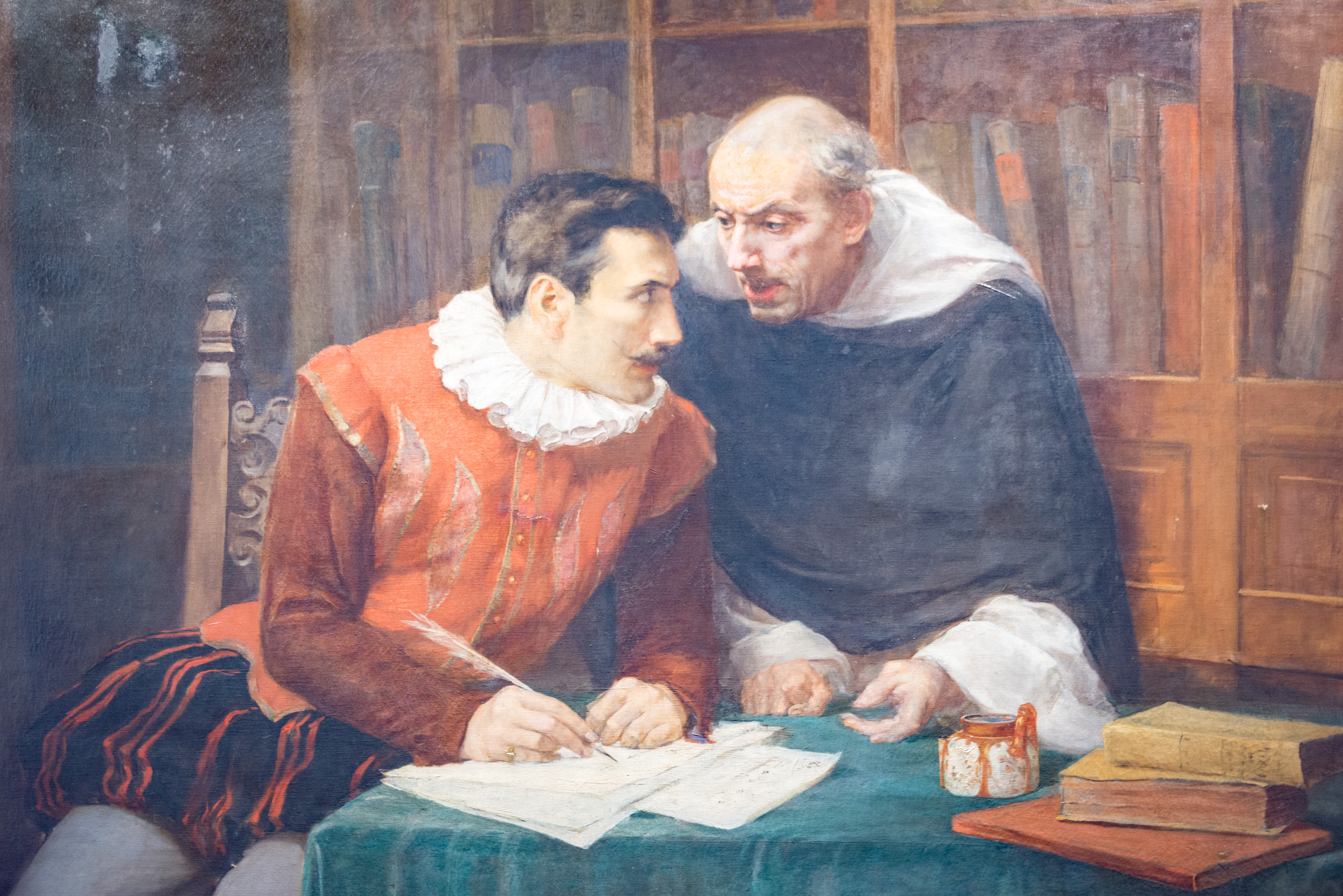
Salazar with Don Luis Perez Dasmariñas (left), painted in 1896 by Félix Resurrección Hidalgo

== External links and additional sources ==
- Cheney, David M. "Archdiocese of Manila". Catholic-Hierarchy.org. (for Chronology of Bishops) ^{[self-published]}
- Chow, Gabriel. "Metropolitan Archdiocese of Manila". GCatholic.org. (for Chronology of Bishops) ^{[self-published]}
- Domingo de Salazar profile, newadvent.org; accessed October 12, 2016.

Catholic Church titles
New title	Bishop of Manila; 1581–1594	Succeeded by Ignacio Santibáñez
