= Archdiocese of Nueva Segovia =

Roman Catholic archdiocese in the Philippines

Coordinates: 17.5748°N 120.3890°E

Archdiocese of Nueva Segovia Archidioecesis Novae Segobiae Arkidiocesis ti Nueva Segovia Arkidiyosesis ng Nueva Segovia Arquidiócesis de Nueva Segovia

Catholic
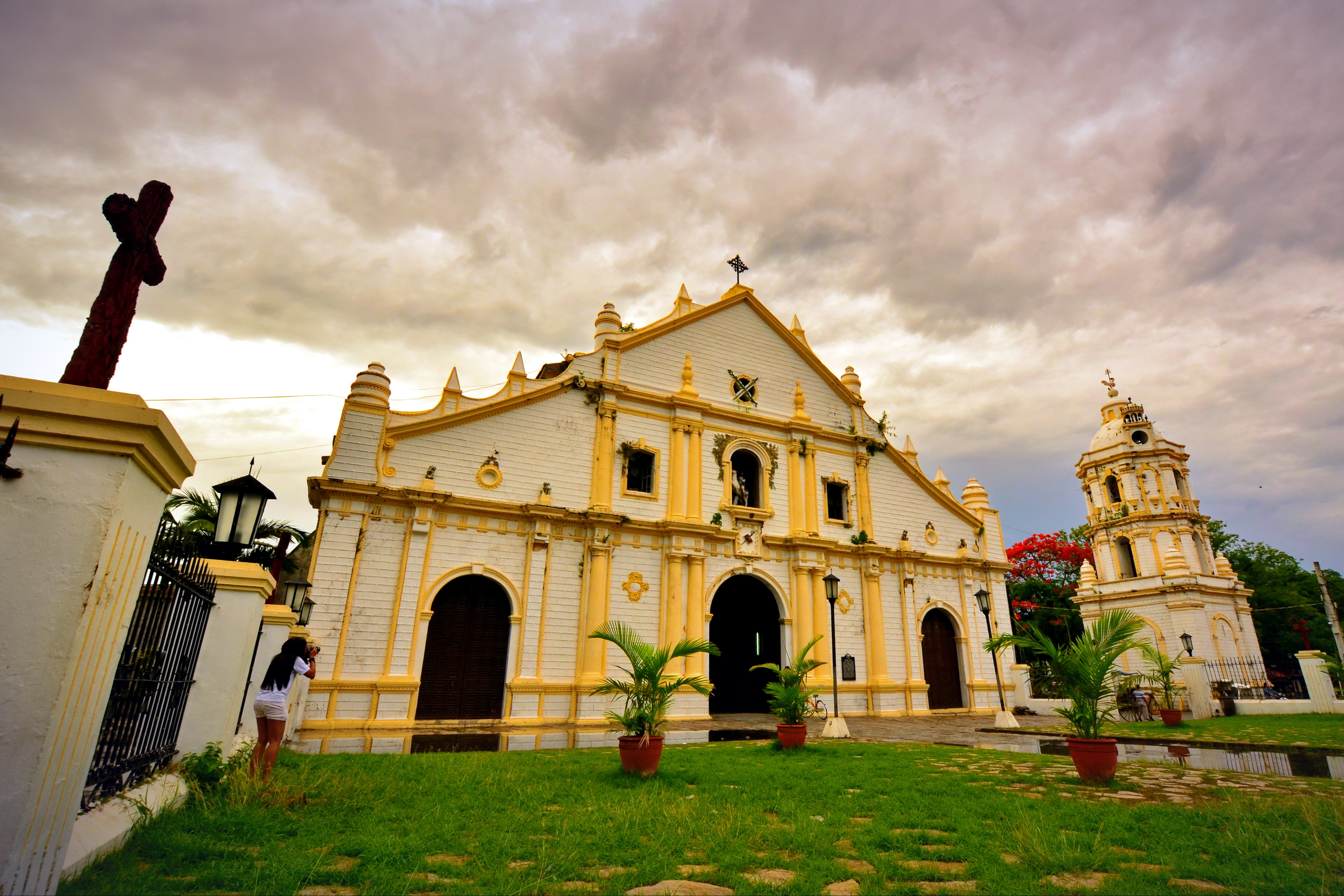
- Vigan Cathedral

- Coat of arms

Location
- Country: Philippines
- Territory: Ilocos Sur
- Ecclesiastical province: Nueva Segovia
- Metropolitan: Nueva Segovia

Statistics
- Area: 2,579 km^{2} (996 sq mi)
- Population: Total; Catholics: (as of 2021); 763,549; 634,569 (83.1%)
- Parishes: 41

Information
- Denomination: Catholic
- Sui iuris church: Latin Church
- Rite: Roman Rite
- Established: August 14, 1595; 431 years ago (Diocese); June 29, 1951; 75 years ago (Archdiocese)
- Cathedral: Metropolitan Cathedral of the Conversion of St. Paul the Apostle
- Co-cathedral: Minor Basilica of Our Lady of the Assumption
- Patron saint: Saint Paul
- Secular priests: 70

Current leadership
- Pope: Leo XIV
- Metropolitan Archbishop: David William Antonio
- Suffragans: Renato Mayugba (Laoag); Leopoldo Jaucian (Bangued); Rafael T. Cruz (Baguio)
- Bishops emeritus: Ernesto Antolin Salgado; Marlo Mendoza Peralta

Map
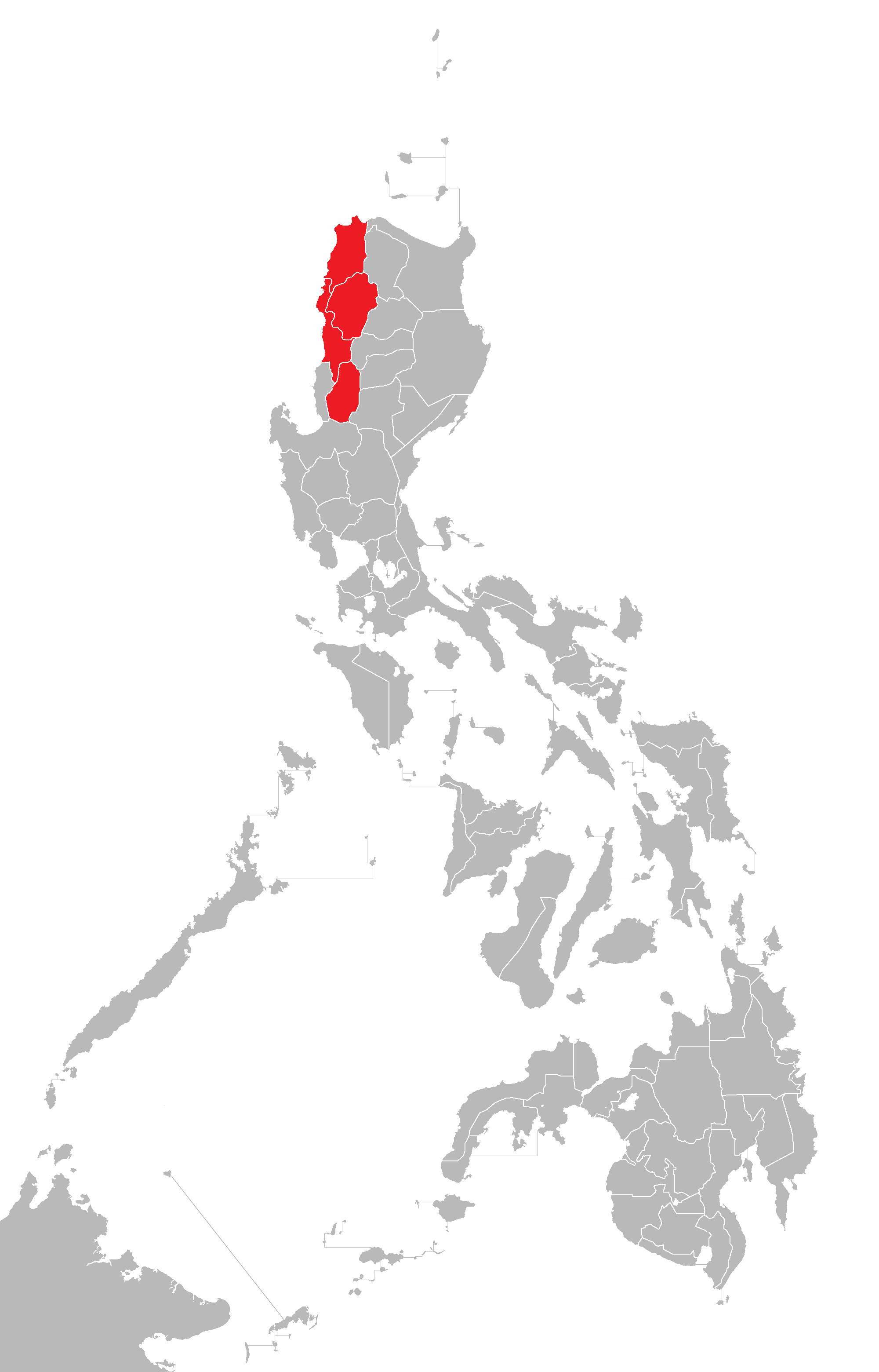
- Jurisdiction of the metropolitan see within the Philippines

The Archdiocese of Nueva Segovia is an archdiocese of the Catholic Church in the Philippines. It covers the province of Ilocos Sur, on the island of Luzon. The see of the archdiocese is the city of Vigan.

The archdiocese was erected in 1595 in the city of Nueva Segovia (modern-day Lal-lo, Cagayan, which has been part of the Archdiocese of Tuguegarao since 1910). The see was transferred to Vigan in 1758 at the request of Bishop Juan de la Fuente Yepes because of its relative distance, during the pontificate of Pope Benedict XIV. It became an archdiocese in 1951.

The archdiocese features the only archbishop's residence in the Philippines built during the Spanish era. It is located beside Vigan Cathedral. The rear of the convent also had access to the nearby Govantes Dike, a convenient exit point by sea, but it is no longer in use because the dike is no longer navigable. Both the archbishop's residence and the cathedral remain among the greatest contributions of the Order of Augustinian Recollects in the Philippines.

The archdiocese operates its own radio station, dzNS ("NS" meaning "New Sound" and "Nueva Segovia"), which is a member of the Catholic Media Network.

It also publishes a weekly newspaper, Timek ti Amianan (Ilocano: Voice of the North).

== History ==
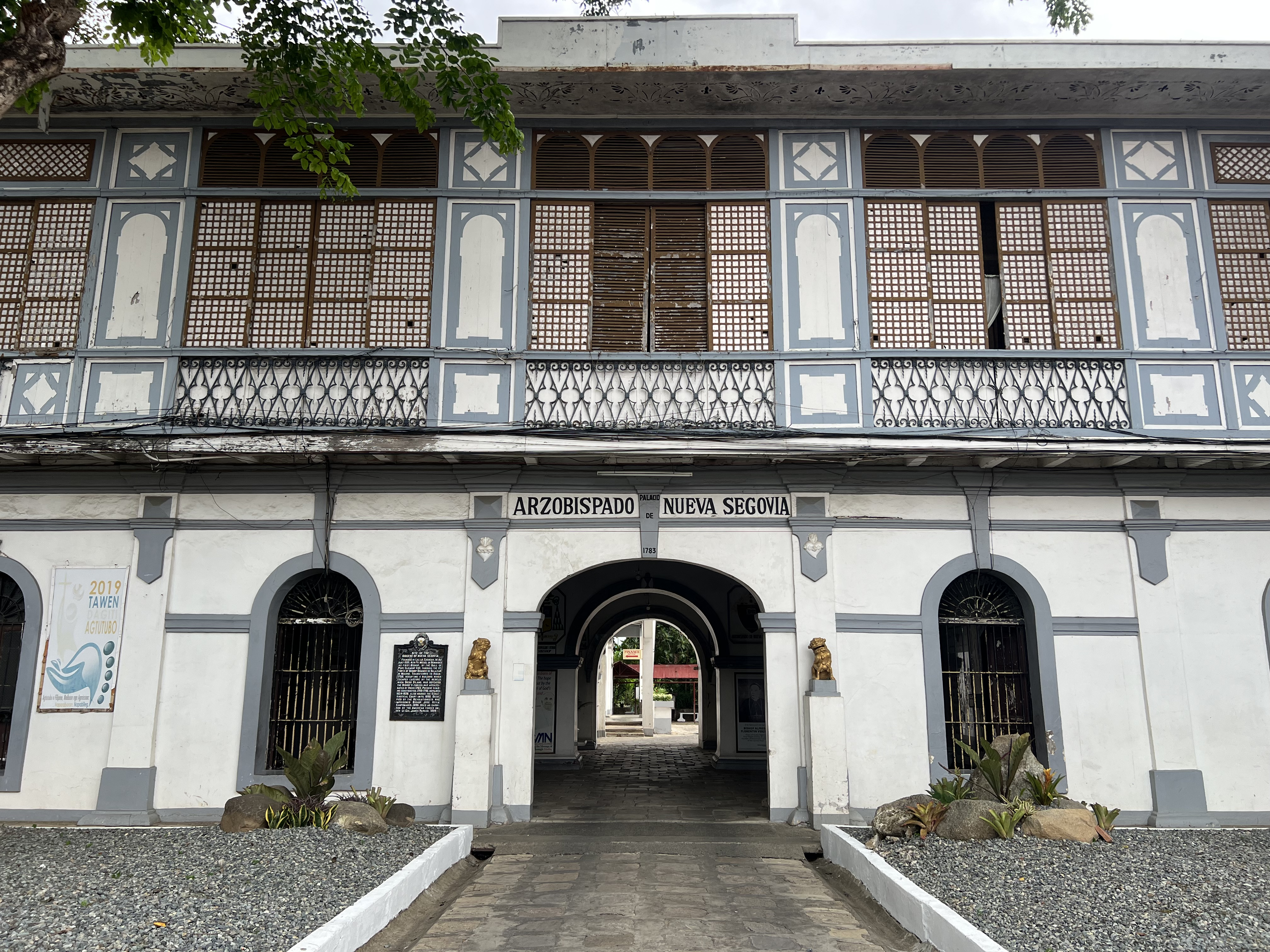
The Archbishop's Palace (Palacio de Arzobispado), the earliest surviving one in the Philippines, built in the 18th century

The Diocese of Nueva Segovia was established together with Cebu and Nueva Cáceres by Pope Clement VIII on August 14, 1595, by virtue of the papal bull Super Specula Militantis Ecclesia under the patronage of the Immaculate Conception. Its first bishop was Miguel de Benavides. The ecclesiastical jurisdiction extended to the provinces of Ilocos Norte, Ilocos Sur, Abra, La Union, Pangasinan, Cagayan, Isabela, Nueva Vizcaya, Batanes, Mountain Province and five northern towns of Tarlac.

Although Vigan was the oldest town created by the Spaniards in the north, it was not made the seat of the diocese which was created for Northern Luzon since the preferred locale, Nueva Segovia, a city at the mouth of the Cagayan River in Cagayan, was by then already a flourishing Spanish settlement while Vigan was then only a pueblo, a town. Eventually however, the city of Nueva Segovia was gradually effaced by the floods of the Rio Grande, and the seat was provisionally transferred to the nearby town of Lal-lo, Cagayan. On September 7, 1758, the seat was permanently transferred to Vigan, retaining the old name, up to the present. The transfer was made at the request of the bishop Juan de la Fuente Yepes during the pontificate of Benedict XIV.

Nueva Segovia was elevated to an archdiocese, separated from Manila on June 29, 1951, by virtue of the papal bull Quo in Philippina Republica of Pope Pius XII. As the other local churches matured, there was eventual weaning from the archdiocese. Presently, it covers the civil province of Ilocos Sur, with the Dioceses of Laoag, Bangued and Baguio, and the Vicariate of Bontoc-Lagawe as suffragans. Santiago C. Sancho was the first archbishop of the newly elevated metropolitan church. Since Sancho, there had been five other ordinaries of Nueva Segovia – Archbishops Juan C. Sison, Jose Tomas Sanchez, Orlando Quevedo, Edmundo Abaya, Ernesto A. Salgado and currently, Marlo Peralta who is 37th bishop and 7th archbishop.

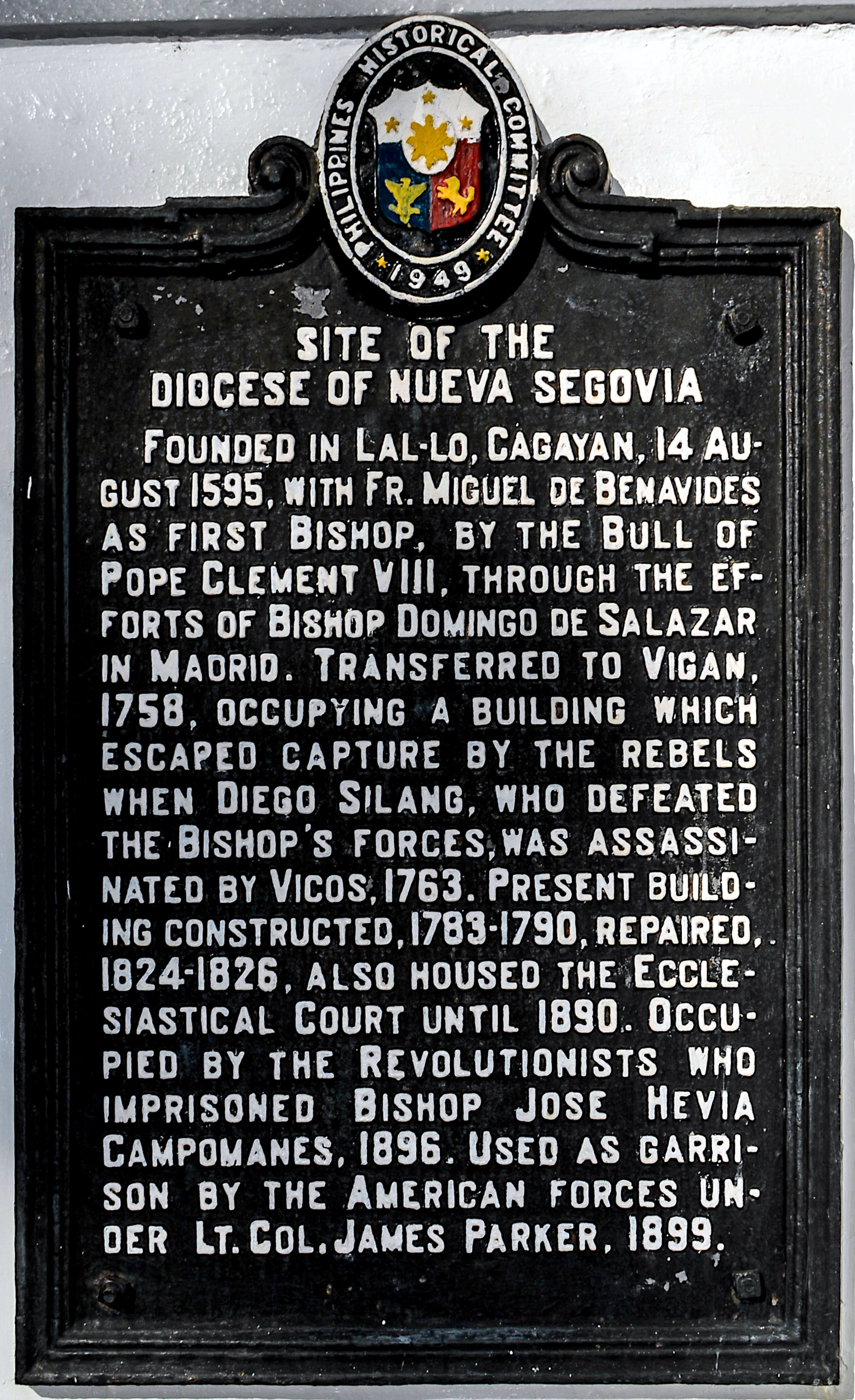
National historical marker installed in 1949, when Nueva Segovia was still a diocese

The archdiocese maintains a complex of mass communications media – an AM radio station, DzNS (963 kHz) founded in 1968; a weekly newspaper, Timek ti Amianan founded in 1983; and a printing press, the Imprenta Nueva Segovia, founded in 1995.

In December 2018, the Nueva Segovia Archdiocesan Archives known as Archivo Nueva Segovia (ANS) was declared a national cultural treasure by the National Archives of the Philippines becoming one of only three archives, including the National Archives and the University of Santo Tomas Archives, to be given the distinction. The archives was established in the early 1990s by Archbishop Orlando Quevedo.

== Coat of arms ==
The sword and the book are symbols of Paul the Apostle, patron saint of the cathedral at Vigan. The sword was the instrument of his martyrdom, the book stands for the gospel which he preached as an apostle. The inscription Gladius Spiritus (Sword of the Spirit) is taken from his epistle to the Ephesians (6:17): "Make the helmet of salvation your own, and the sword of the Spirit, God's word." The red background stands for his burning zeal for souls and for his martyrdom.

The snaky figure in silver that traverses the bottom of the field represents the Abra river on the north bank of which is the seat of the archdiocese of Nueva Segovia.

The popular name of the seat of Nueva Segovia is Vigan which derived its name from the Ilocano word "bigaan," a contraction of 'cabigaan' meaning where the 'biga' abounds, a plant of the taro family but bigger than the taro and with bigger tubers; hence its scientific name Alocasia macrorhiza meaning an alocasia with big root.

== Ordinaries ==
=== Bishops and archbishops ===
Bishop		Period in office	Notes	Coat of arms
Bishops of Nueva Segovia (August 30, 1595 – June 29, 1951)
1	Miguel de Benavides	August 30, 1595 – October 7, 1602 (7 years, 38 days)	Appointed metropolitan archbishop of Manila	
2	Diego Soria	November 15, 1602 – 1613 (approximately 10–11 years)	Died in office	
3	Miguel García Serrano	August 3, 1616 – February 12, 1618 (1 year, 193 days)	Appointed metropolitan archbishop of Manila	
4	Juan Rentería	March 5, 1618 – 1626 (approximately 8 years)	Died in office	
5	Hernando Guerrero	May 17, 1627 – January 9, 1634 (6 years, 237 days)	Appointed metropolitan archbishop of Manila	
6	Diego Aduarte	January 23, 1634 – 1636 (approximately 2 years)	Died in office	
7	Fernando Montero Espinosa	July 16, 1639 – February 5, 1646 (6 years, 204 days)	Appointed metropolitan archbishop of Manila	
8	Rodrigo Cárdenas	May 30, 1650 – May 1661 (approximately 11 years)	Died in office	
—N/a	José Millán de Poblete	May 27, 1675 – 1675	Died before his episcopal consecration	
9	Francisco Pizaro de Orellana	May 27, 1680 – September 2, 1683 (3 years, 98 days)	Died in office	
10	Diego de Gorospe e Irala	June 1, 1699 – May 20, 1715 (15 years, 353 days)	Died in office	
—N/a	Pedro Mejorada	October 1, 1717 – July 31, 1719 (1 year, 303 days)	Bishop-elect; died in office	
11	Jeronimo Herrera y Lopez	November 20, 1724 – March 1742 (approximately 17.3 years)	Died in office	
—N/a	Manuel del Rio Flores	May 16, 1744 – 1745 (approximately 1 year)	Bishop-elect; died in office	
—N/a	Juan de Arechederra	January 19, 1750 – November 12, 1751 (1 year, 297 days)	Bishop-elect; died in office	
12	Juan de la Fuente Yepes	May 28, 1753 – 1757 (approximately 4 years)	Died in office	
—N/a	Bernardo de Ustariz	December 19, 1763 – August 2, 1764 (227 days)	Bishop-elect; died in office	
13	Miguel García San Esteban	September 16, 1768 – November 11, 1779 (11 years, 56 days)	Died in office	
14	Juan García Ruiz	June 25, 1784 – May 2, 1796 (11 years, 312 days)	Died in office	
15	Agustín Pedro Blaquier	July 20, 1801 – December 31, 1803 (2 years, 164 days)	Died in office	
16	Cayetano Pallás	October 6, 1806 – 1814 (approximately 7 years)	Died in office	
17	Francisco Albán Barreiro	April 14, 1817 – December 8, 1837 (20 years, 238 days)	Died in office	
—N/a	Rafael Masoliver	January 19, 1846 – 1846	Bishop-elect; died in office	
18	Vicente Barreiro y Pérez	April 14, 1848 – May 17, 1856 (8 years, 33 days)	Died in office	
19	Juan José Aragonés	March 27, 1865 – August 14, 1872 (7 years, 140 days)	Died in office	
20	Mariano Cuartero y Sierra	January 16, 1874 – August 2, 1887 (13 years, 198 days)	Died in office	
21	José Hevía y Campomanes	May 27, 1889 – June 12, 1903 (14 years, 16 days)	Appointed bishop of Badajoz	
22	Dennis Joseph Dougherty	June 12, 1903 – June 21, 1908 (5 years, 9 days)	Appointed bishop of Jaro	
23	James Jordan Carroll	June 21, 1908 – October 26, 1912 (4 years, 127 days)	Appointed titular bishop of Metellopolis	
24	Peter Joseph Hurth	January 7, 1913 – November 12, 1926 (13 years, 309 days)	Appointed titular archbishop of Bostra	
25	Santiago Caragnan Sancho	April 22, 1927 – June 29, 1951 (24 years, 68 days)	Elevated as archbishop	
Metropolitan archbishops of Nueva Segovia (June 29, 1951 – present)
1	Santiago Caragnan Sancho	June 29, 1951 – October 12, 1966 (15 years, 105 days)	Died in office	
2	Juan Callanta Sison	October 12, 1966 – September 12, 1981 (14 years, 335 days)	Died in office	
3	Jose Tomas Sanchez	January 12, 1982 – March 22, 1986 (4 years, 69 days)	Appointed secretary of the Congregation for the Evangelization of Peoples	
4	Orlando Beltran Quevedo	March 22, 1986 – May 30, 1998 (12 years, 69 days)	Appointed metropolitan archbishop of Cotabato	
5	Edmundo Madarang Abaya	May 22, 1999 – May 31, 2005 (6 years, 9 days)	Retired	
6	Ernesto Antolin Salgado	May 31, 2005 – April 2, 2014 (8 years, 306 days)	Retired	
7	Marlo Mendoza Peralta	April 2, 2014 – January 14, 2026 (11 years, 287 days)	Retired	
8	David William Antonio	January 14, 2026 – present (304 days)		

=== Coadjutor archbishops ===
No.	Bishop	Period in office	Notes	Coat of arms
1	Juan Callanta Sison	August 20, 1956 – October 12, 1966 (10 years, 53 days)	Succeeded Archbishop Sancho in 1966	

=== Auxiliary bishops ===
No.	Bishop	Period in office	Titular see	Notes	Coat of arms
1	Juan Callanta Sison	July 25, 1947 – August 20, 1956 (9 years, 26 days)	Limata	Appointed coadjutor archbishop, later succeeded as metropolitan archbishop	
2	Victorino Cristobal Ligot	March 27, 1969 – February 6, 1970 (316 days)	Budua	Appointed bishop of San Fernando de La Union	
3	Miguel Gatan Purugganan	April 22, 1971 – January 21, 1974 (2 years, 274 days)	Egnatia	Appointed bishop of Ilagan	
4	Antonio Isauro Alzate Buenafe	February 9, 1976 – May 7, 1976 (−88 days)	Meta	Died in office	
5	Salvador Lazo Lazo	August 3, 1977 – January 20, 1981 (3 years, 170 days)	Selia	Appointed bishop of San Fernando de La Union	
6	Patricio Maqui Lopez	December 5, 1985 – February 20, 1991 (5 years, 77 days)	Arba	Died in office	
7	David William Valencia Antonio	August 26, 2011 – November 14, 2018 (7 years, 80 days)	Basti	Appointed bishop of Ilagan	

== Suffragan dioceses and bishops ==
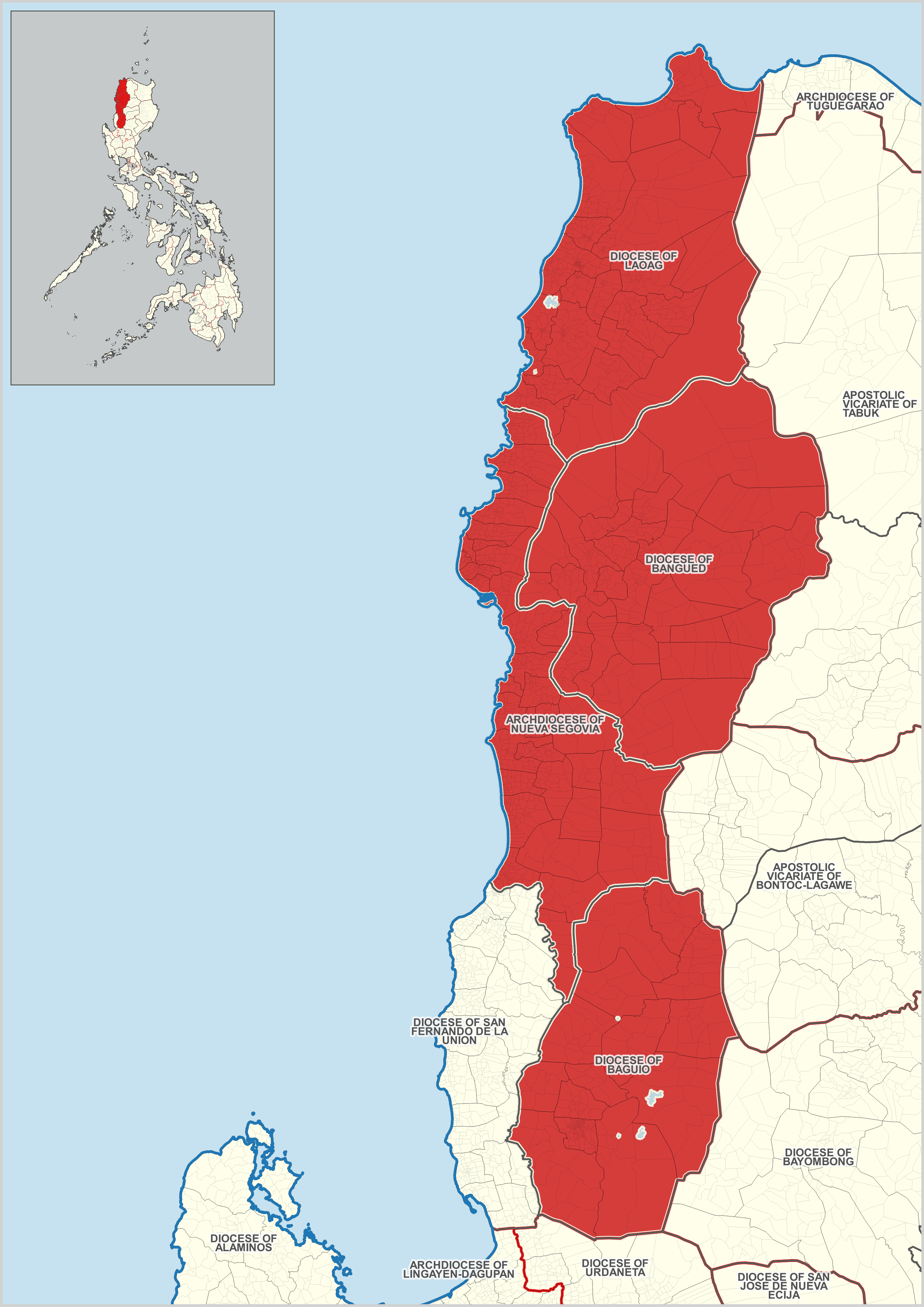
Ecclesiastical Province of Nueva Segovia

Diocese	Image	Bishop	Period in office	Coat of arms
Baguio (Baguio City, Benguet)		Rafael T. Cruz	September 17, 2024 – present (2 years, 58 days)	
Bangued (Abra)		Sede vacante	Since November 7, 2026 (7 days)	
Laoag (Ilocos Norte)		Renato P. Mayugba	December 11, 2012 – present (13 years, 338 days)	

== Notable churches under the jurisdiction of the Archdiocese ==
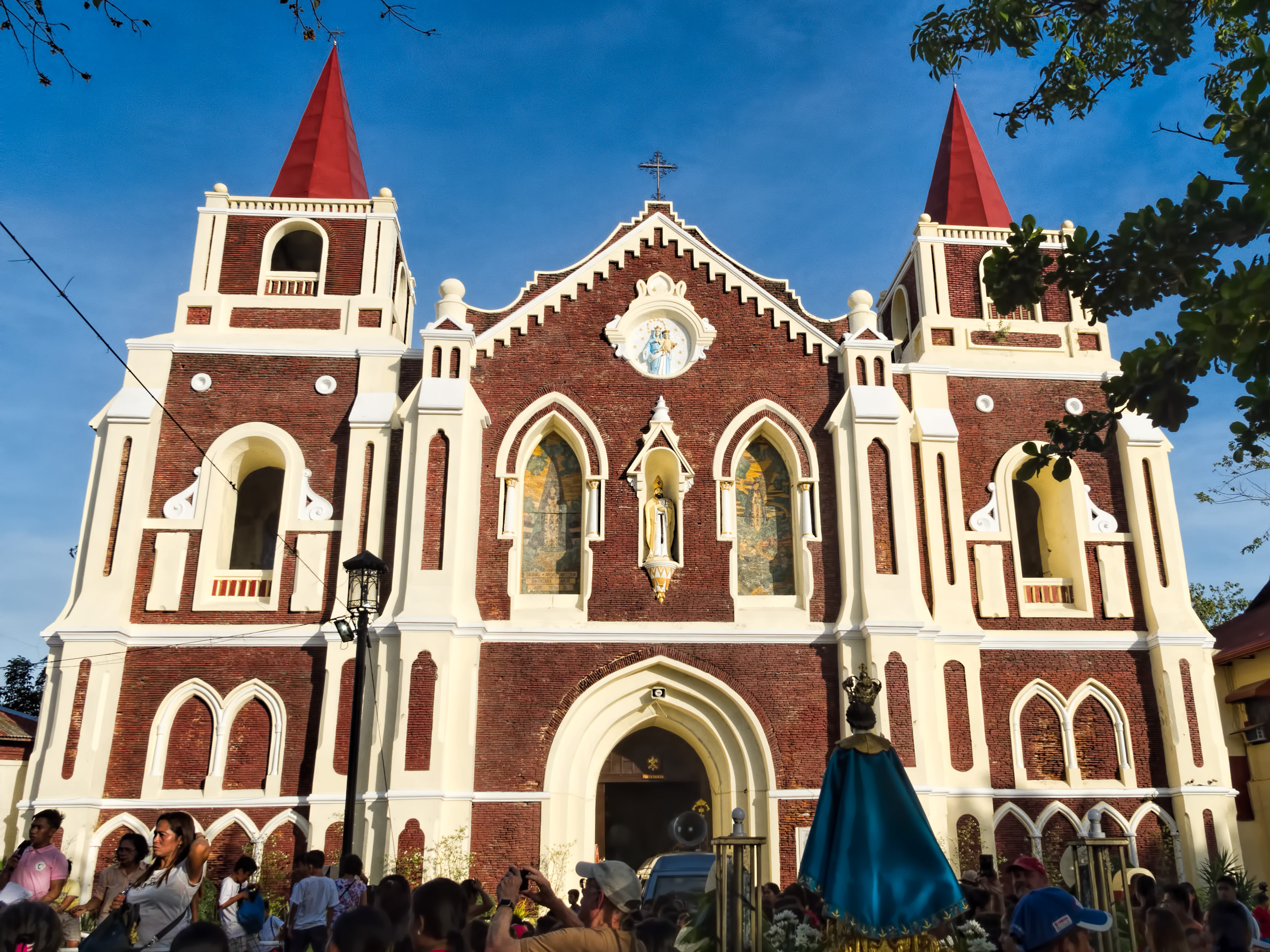
Conversion of Saint Augustine Parish, Bantay

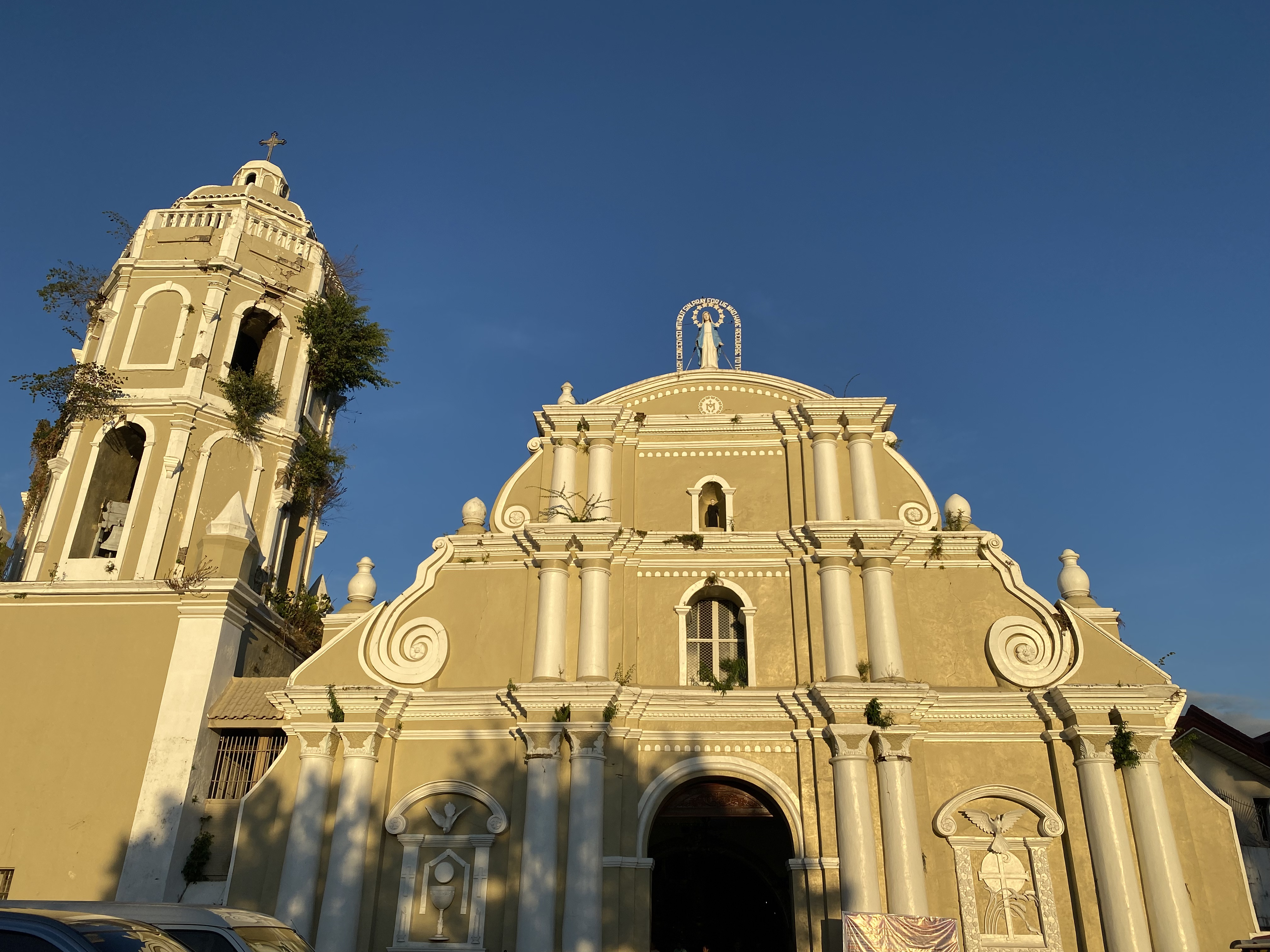
Saint John of Sahagun Parish Church, Candon City

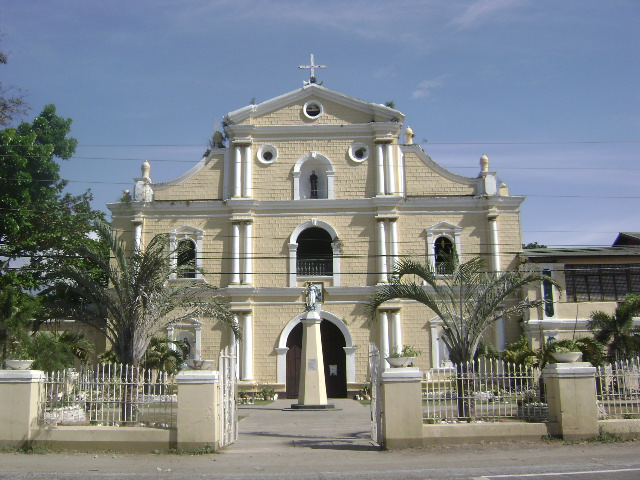
Saint William the Hermit Parish, Magsingal

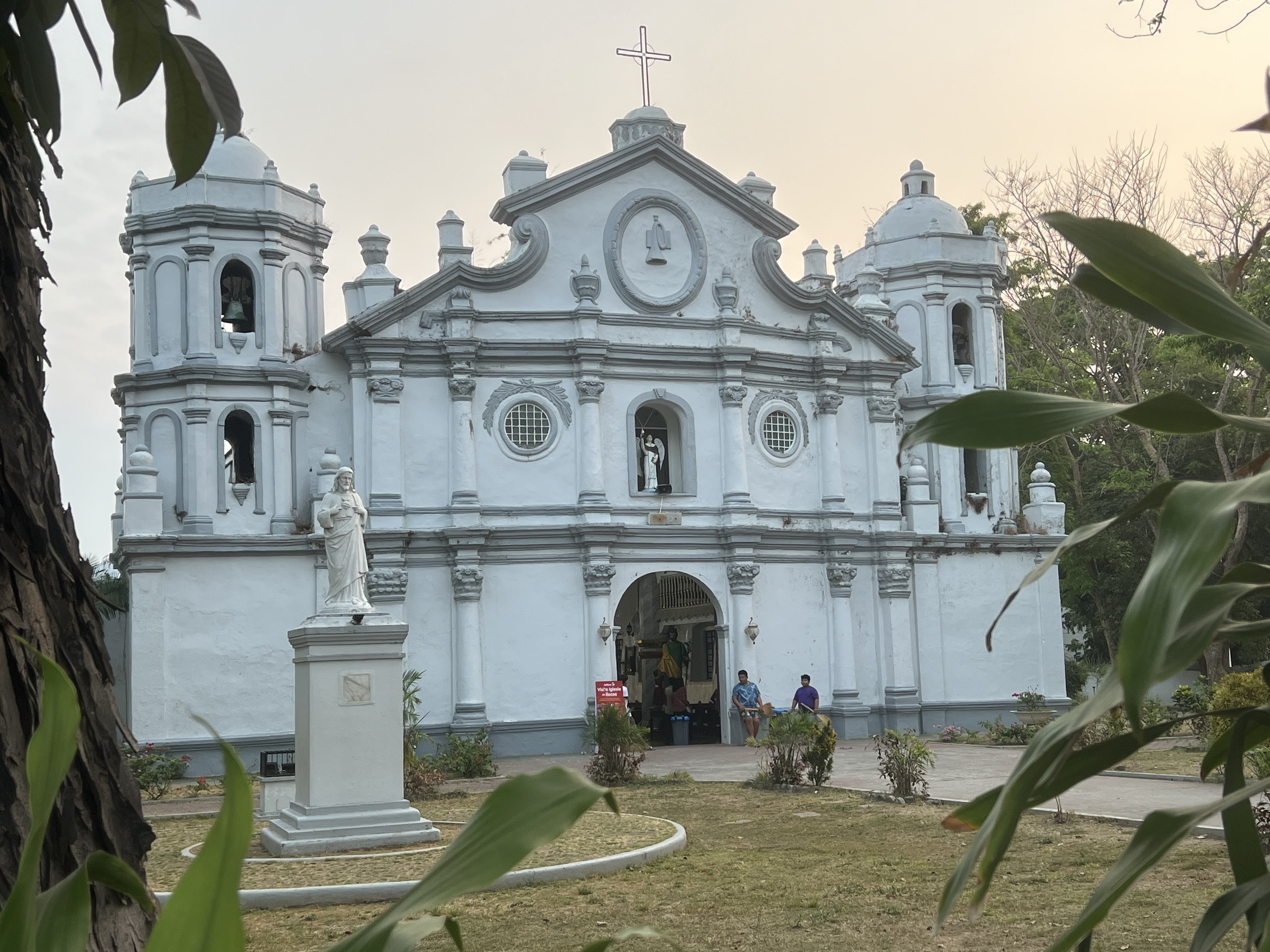
Archdiocesan Shrine of Saint Vincent Ferrer, San Vicente

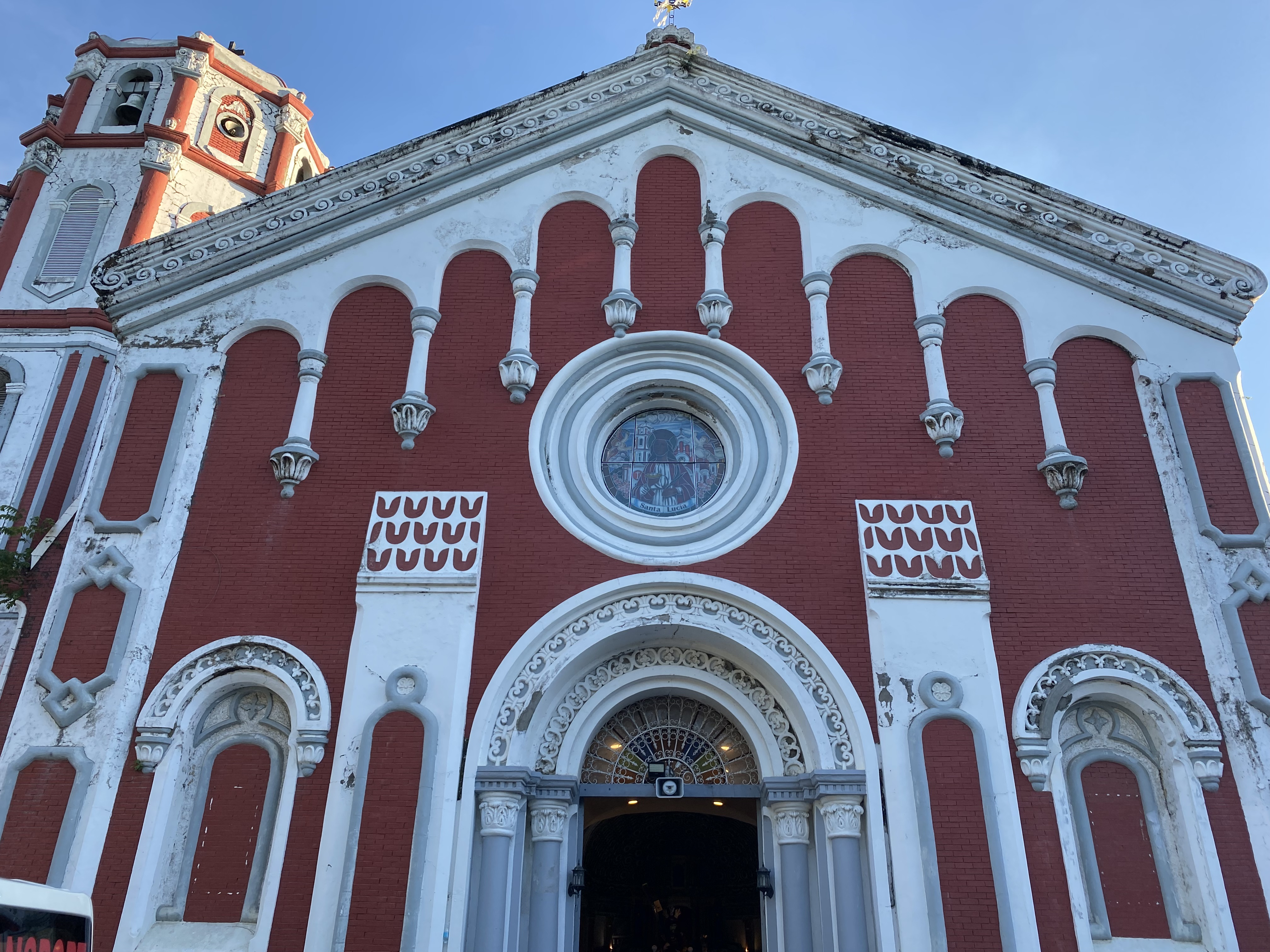
Archdiocesan Shrine of Saint Lucy the Martyr, Santa Lucia

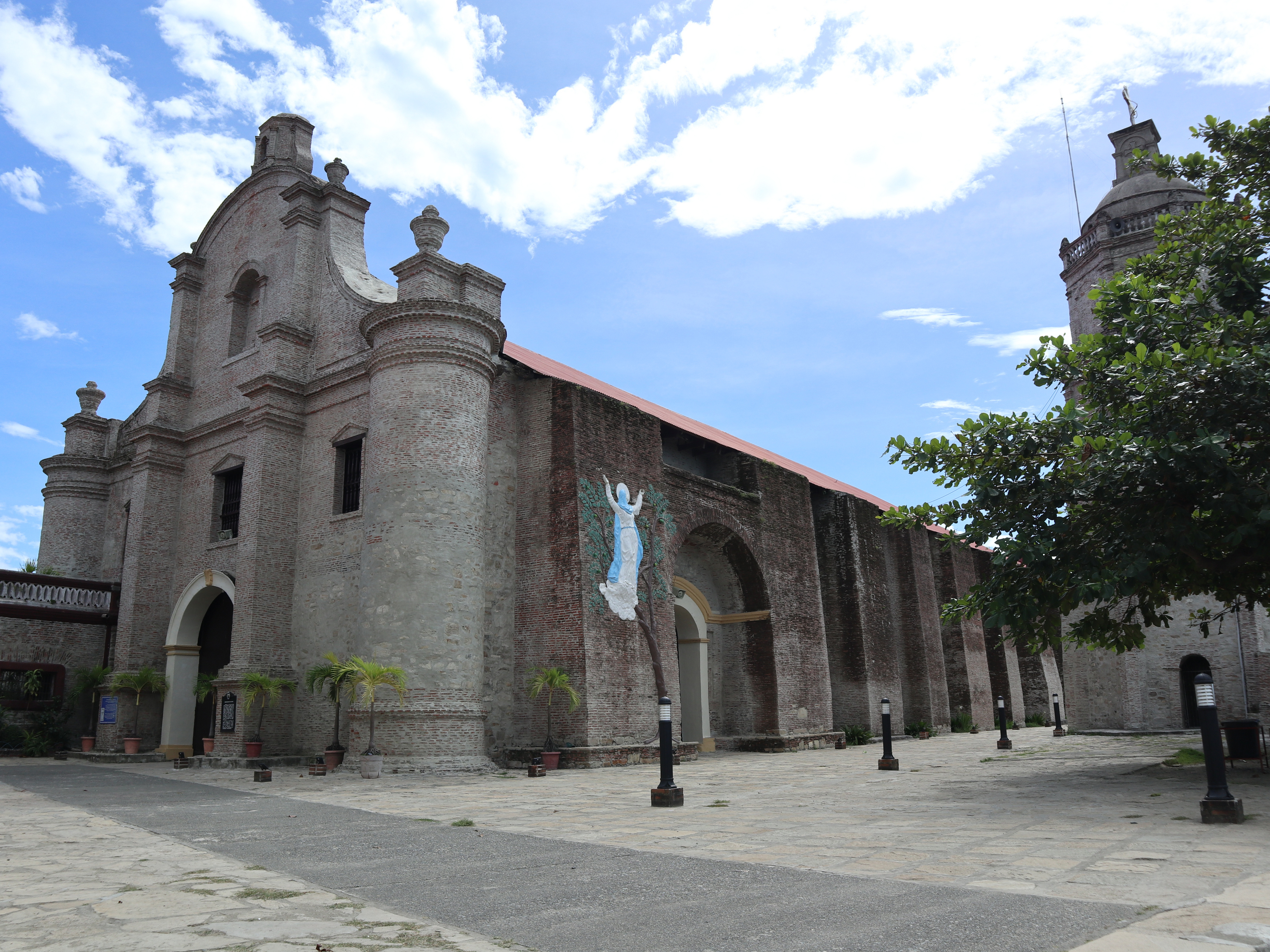
Minor Basilica of Our Lady of the Assumption, Santa Maria

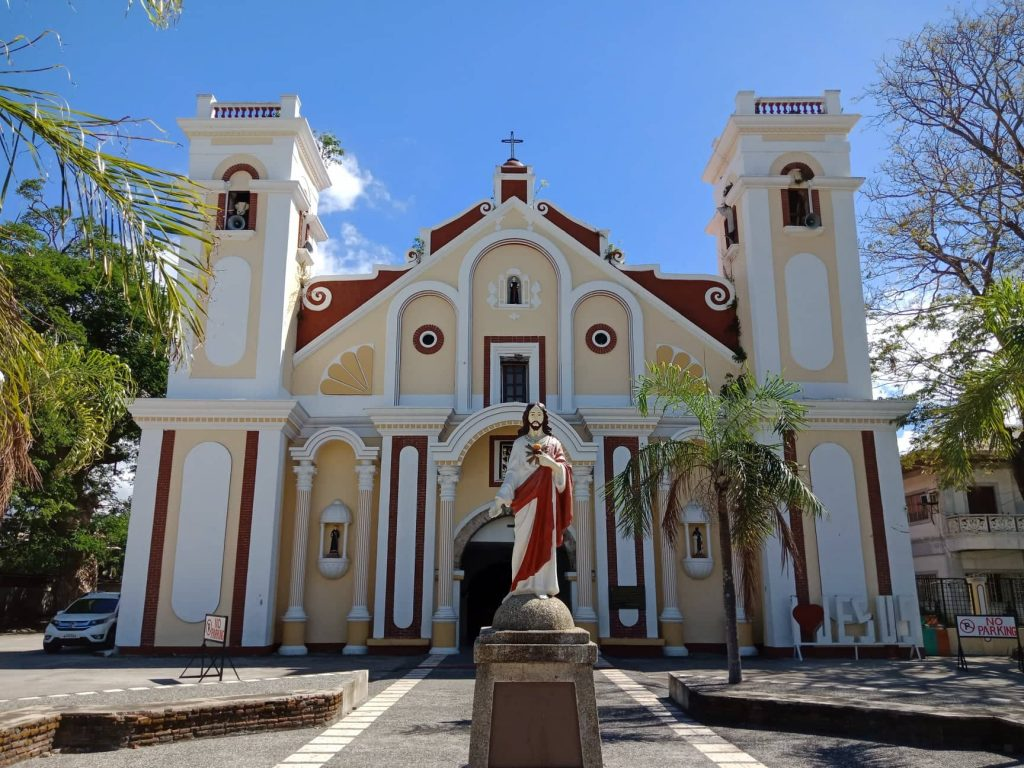
Minor Basilica of Saint Nicholas of Tolentine, Sinait

== See also ==
- Catholic Church in the Philippines
- List of Catholic dioceses in the Philippines
- List of Catholic archdioceses
