= Carlos Sánchez Romero =

Mexican politician (1970–2025)

- Born: 5 November 1970; San Martín Texmelucan de Labastida, Puebla, Mexico
- Died: 20 November 2025 (aged 55)
- Occupation: Politician
- Political party: PRI

Carlos Sánchez Romero (Note: In this Spanish name, the first or paternal surname is Sánchez and the second or maternal family name is Romero.) (5 November 1970 – 20 November 2025) was a Mexican politician affiliated with the Institutional Revolutionary Party (PRI).

== Life and career ==
Sánchez Romero served as the municipal president of San Martín Texmelucan, Puebla, in 2011–2012 and, in the 2012 general election, he was elected to the Chamber of Deputies to represent Puebla's 5th district during the 62nd session of Congress.

He was also elected as Janet González Tostado's alternate deputy for Puebla's 5th during the 61st Congress but was not called upon to serve.

Sánchez Romero died from a heart attack on 20 November 2025, at the age of 55.
