= 5th federal electoral district of Puebla =

Federal electoral district of Mexico

Puebla's 5th
- Electoral district of the Chamber of Deputies of Mexico

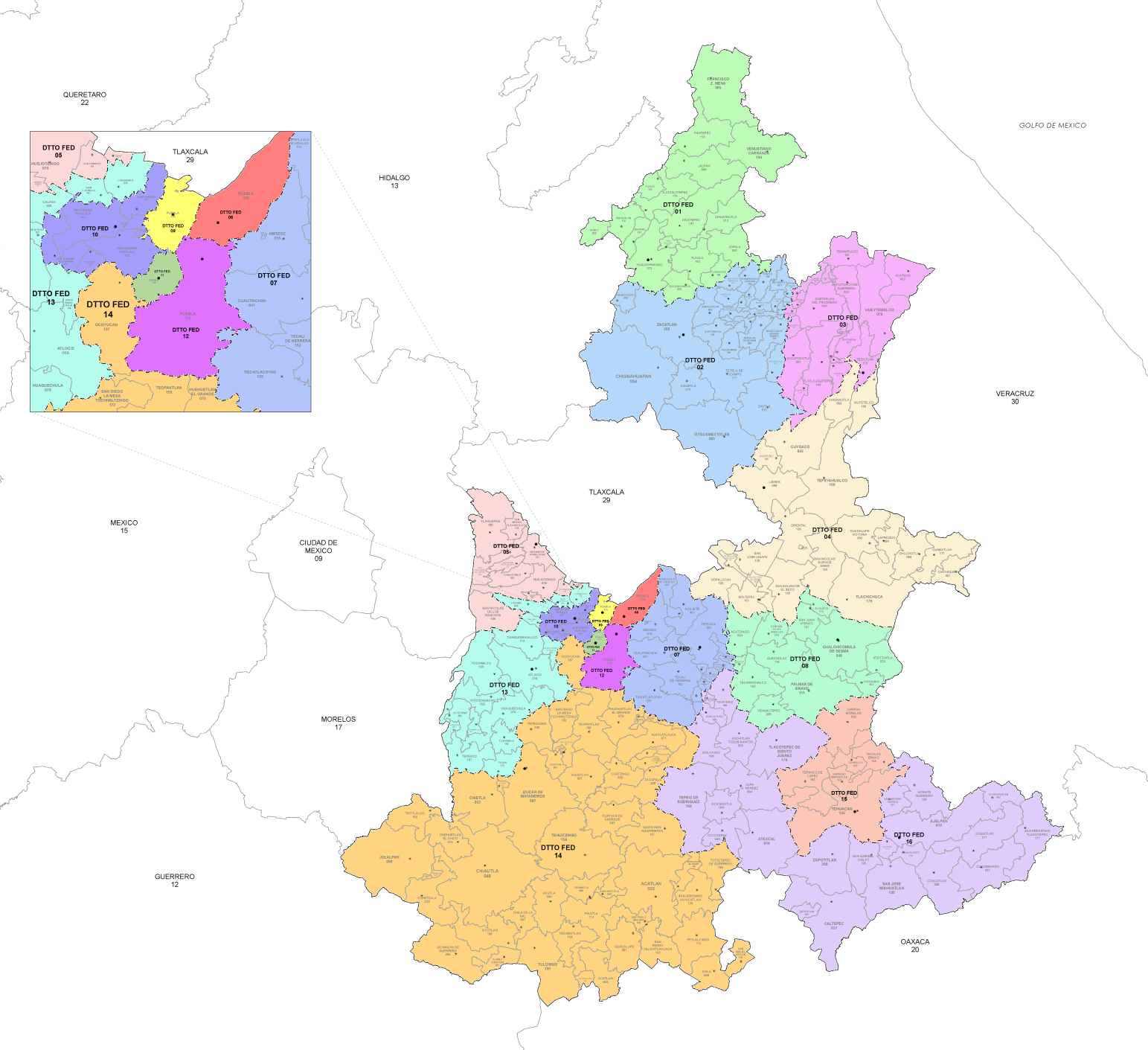
- 5th district since 2023

Incumbent
- Member: Vianey García Romero
- Party: ▌Morena
- Congress: 66th (2024–2027)

District
- State: Puebla
- Head town: San Martin Texmelucan
- Coordinates: 19°17′N 98°26′W
- Covers: 11 municipalities: Chiautzingo, Domingo Arenas, Huejotzingo, San Felipe Teotlalcingo, San Martin Texmelucan, San Matías Tlalancaleca, San Miguel Xoxtla, San Nicolás de los Ranchos, San Salvador el Verde, Tlahuapan, Tlaltenango
- PR region: Fourth
- Precincts: 142
- Population: 417,480 (2020 census)

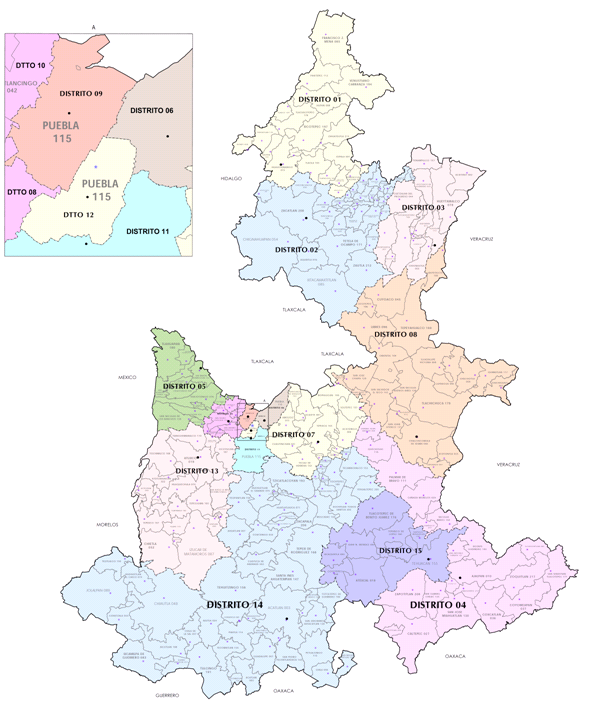
Puebla's districts in 2017–2022

The 5th federal electoral district of Puebla (Spanish: Distrito electoral federal 05 de Puebla) is one of the 300 electoral districts into which Mexico is divided for elections to the federal Chamber of Deputies and one of 16 such districts in the state of Puebla.

It elects one deputy to the lower house of Congress for each three-year legislative session by means of the first-past-the-post system. Votes cast in the district also count towards the calculation of proportional representation ("plurinominal") deputies elected from the fourth region.

The current member for the district, elected in the 2024 general election, is Rafaela Vianey García Romero of the National Regeneration Movement (Morena).

== District territory ==
Under the 2023 districting plan adopted by the National Electoral Institute (INE), which is to be used for the 2024, 2027 and 2030 federal elections, Puebla's congressional seat allocation rose from 15 to 16. The 5th district is in the north-west of the state, wedged between the states of Mexico and Tlaxcala. It covers 142 electoral precincts (secciones electorales) across 11 of the state's municipalities:

- Chiautzingo, Domingo Arenas, Huejotzingo, San Felipe Teotlalcingo, San Martin Texmelucan, San Matías Tlalancaleca, San Miguel Xoxtla, San Nicolás de los Ranchos, San Salvador el Verde, Tlahuapan and Tlaltenango.

The head town (cabecera distrital), where results from individual polling stations are gathered together and tallied, is the city of San Martin Texmelucan de Labastida. The district reported a population of 417,480 in the 2020 census.

== Previous districting schemes ==
Evolution of electoral district numbers
	1974	1978	1996	2005	2017	2023
Puebla	10	14	15	16	15	16
Chamber of Deputies	196	300				

2017–2022

From 2017 to 2022, when Puebla was assigned 15 congressional seats, the district's head town was at San Martin Texmelucan and it covered 13 municipalities.

2005–2017

Under the 2005 plan, the district was one of 16 in Puebla. Its head town was at San Martin Texmelucan and it covered 11 municipalities.

1996–2005

Between 1996 and 2005, Puebla had 15 districts. The 5th covered 15 municipalities, with its head town at San Martin Texmelucan.

1978–1996

The districting scheme in force from 1978 to 1996 was the result of the 1977 electoral reforms, which increased the number of single-member seats in the Chamber of Deputies from 196 to 300. Under that plan, Puebla's seat allocation rose from 10 to 14. The 5th district's head town was at Acatlán in the south of the state and it covered 33 municipalities .

== Deputies returned to Congress ==
(Mexico) National parties
- Current
- PAN
- PRI
- PT
- PVEM
- MC
- Morena
- PAZ
- Somos
- Defunct or local only
- PLM
- PNR
- PRM
- PNM
- PP
- PPS
- PARM
- PFCRN
- CON
- PANAL
- PSD
- PES
- PES
- PRD

Puebla's 5th district
Election	Deputy	Party	Term	Legislature
1916	David Pastrana Jaimes		1916–1917	Constituent Congress of Querétaro
...
1976	Sacramento Joffre Vázquez	Institutional Revolutionary Party	1976–1979	50th Congress
1979	Juan Bonilla Luna	Institutional Revolutionary Party	1979–1982	51st Congress
1982	Olegario Valencia Portillo	Institutional Revolutionary Party	1982–1985	52nd Congress
1985	Víctor Hugo Islas Hernández	Institutional Revolutionary Party	1985–1988	53rd Congress
1988	Cupertino Alejo Domínguez	Institutional Revolutionary Party	1988–1991	54th Congress
1991	José Porfirio Alarcón Hernández	Institutional Revolutionary Party	1991–1994	55th Congress
1994	Fidencio Romero Tobón	Institutional Revolutionary Party	1994–1997	56th Congress
1997	América Soto López	Institutional Revolutionary Party	1997–2000	57th Congress
2000	José Gaudencio Víctor León Castañeda	National Action Party (Mexico)	2000–2003	58th Congress
2003	Víctor Hugo Islas Hernández	Institutional Revolutionary Party	2003–2006	59th Congress
2006	Apolonio Méndez Meneses	National Action Party (Mexico)	2006–2009	60th Congress
2009	Janet Graciela González Tostado	Institutional Revolutionary Party	2009–2012	61st Congress
2012	Carlos Sánchez Romero	Institutional Revolutionary Party	2012–2015	62nd Congress
2015	Rubén Alejandro Garrido Muñoz	National Action Party (Mexico)	2015–2018	63rd Congress
2018	Lizeth Sánchez García (Note: Sánchez García resigned her seat on 24/06/2019 and was replaced for the remainder of her term by her alternate, Huerta Hernández.); Martha Huerta Hernández	Labour Party (Mexico)	2018–2019; 2019–2021	64th Congress
2021	Mauricio Alonso Toledo Gutiérrez; Jaime Baltierra García	Labour Party (Mexico)	— 2021–2024	65th Congress
2024	Rafaela Vianey García Romero	National Regeneration Movement	2024–2027	66th Congress

== Presidential elections ==
Puebla's 5th district
Election	District won by	Party or coalition	%
2018	Andrés Manuel López Obrador	Juntos Haremos Historia	62.6481
2024	Claudia Sheinbaum Pardo	Sigamos Haciendo Historia	67.4892
