= Chautla Hacienda =

Estate in Puebla, Mexico

Coordinates: 19°18′57.46″N 98°28′15.98″W

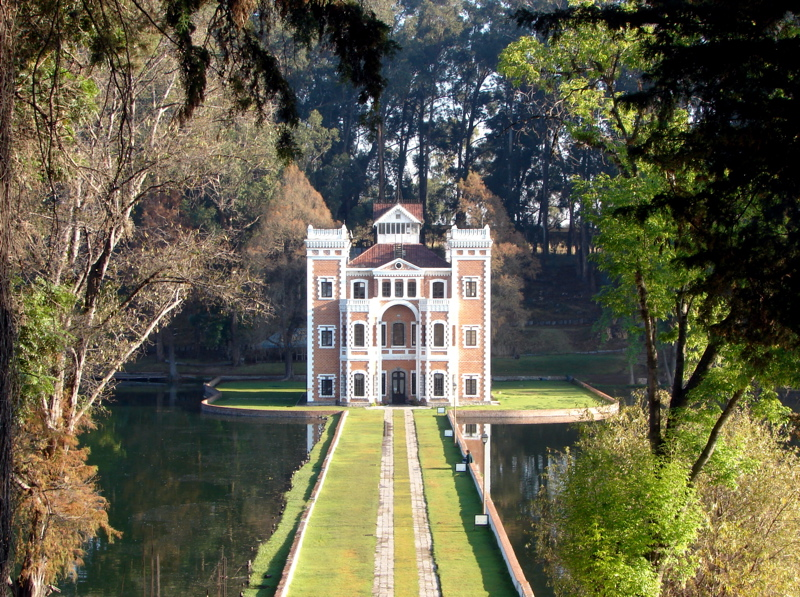
El Castillo at the Chautla Hacienda

The Chautla Hacienda was a formerly vast extension of farmland located in the San Martin Texmelucan Valley in the state of Puebla, northwest of the city of Puebla in Mexico. It was established in the 18th century, primarily producing grain. In the 19th century, it became the property of an Englishman by the name of Thomas Gillow. He passed the property to his son Eulogio Gillow, who became the first archbishop of Antequera (city of Oaxaca) of the Roman Catholic Archdiocese of Antequera. Eulogio worked to modernize the hacienda, building the first hydroelectric dam in Latin America on the property. He also built the property's signature building, an English style residence, locally called "El Castillo" (The Castle) which overlooks the dam. Today, only a small fraction of the hacienda remains, and it is run as a recreational and cultural center by an agency of the state of Puebla.

== Description ==
The present-day hacienda is located in the San Martin Texmelucan Valley, eight km outside the city of the same name, in the municipality of San Salvador el Verde. Located between Mexico City and Puebla, the hacienda lies within the Puebla metropolitan area. In the colonial era, the nearby highway which crosses the valley served as a market road that transported agricultural goods to the larger cities of Mexico City, Puebla and Veracruz. The area has a slightly cooler and wetter climate than Mexico City, and the property is ringed by the remains of what were large forests. Overall, the property measures about sixty hectares, thirty five of which is forest and twelve is surface water. The property includes the original manor house, a small lake formed by a dam built on the Atoyac River, and an English style residence hall on the edge of the lake.

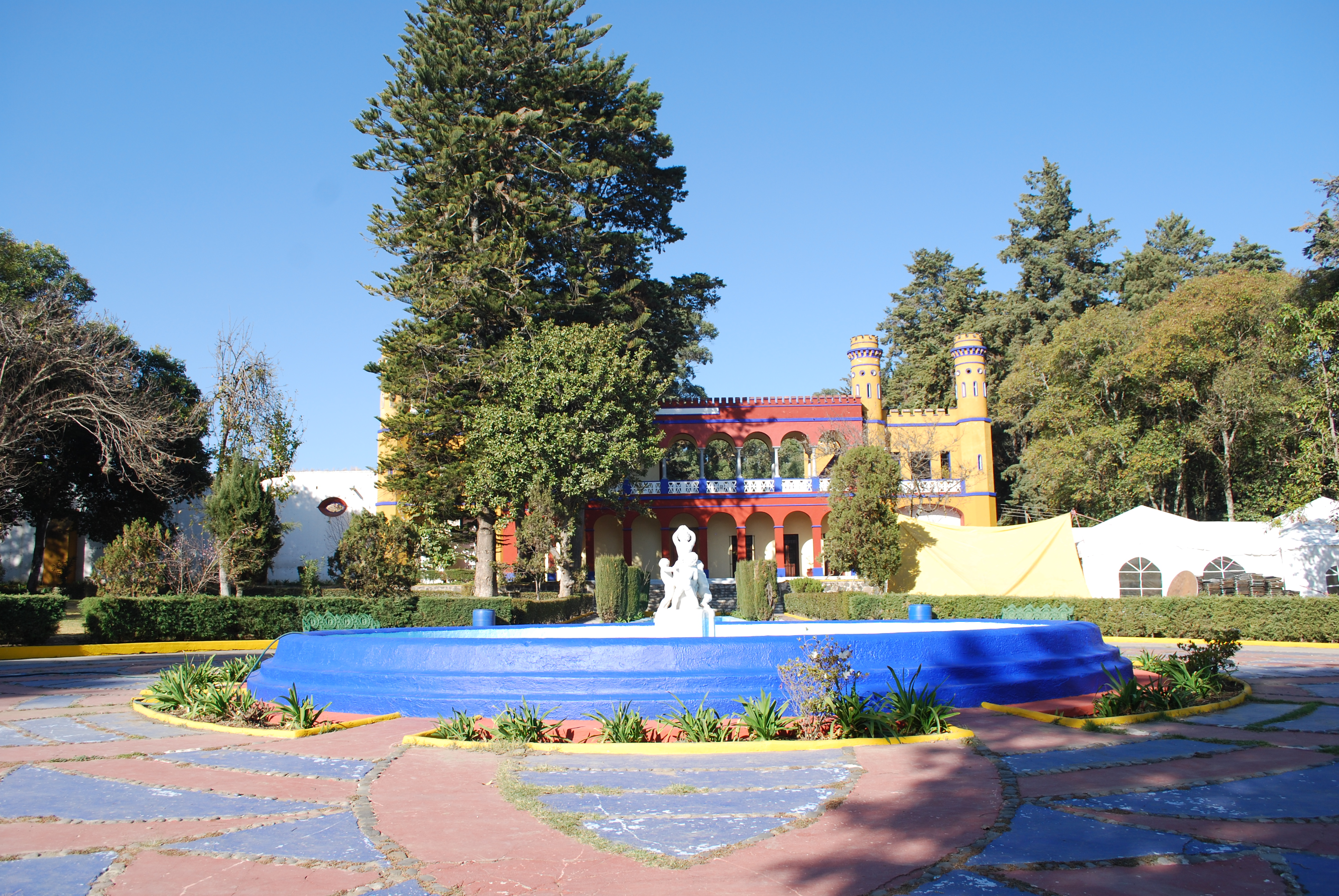
Facade of the main hacienda house

The manor house was originally built by the Marquis of Selva Negra, the first owner of the property, but different parts of the complex date from different times. It is built at an elevation which overlooks the property, although trees block the view of the lake. The house now serves as the entrance to the hacienda and it is surrounded by a number of ash trees that are centuries old. Visitors enter a side portal into the inner courtyard. The courtyard fountain, built in 1941, is covered in Talavera plates and tiles. Opposite the fountain is a small chapel. The four flanks of the building enclosing the courtyard feature small watchtowers on the four outer corners. The entrance to the site museum is on the north side. The museum contains photographs, paintings, furniture and other items displayed among the former rooms of the house including the salon, the kitchen, the dining room and one of the bedrooms. Beside the manor house are the remains of other hacienda buildings such as horse stables. To reach the rest of the property, one exits the house into the east garden, which is one of several on the property. This garden contains a large white fountain flanked by two reflecting pools. In this garden, there are a number of paths, including one that leads to the lake and the English style residence.

The lake is formed by a dam which was originally created by a former owner in the late 19th century. It covers about twelve hectares and is divided into two sections by a land bridge that leads to what is considered to be the most iconic building on the property. An English style residence house, locally called “El Castillo” (The Castle), was originally built as a residence hall for teachers at a planned agricultural college by the same owner who created the dam. It is a brick building with white accents. Above the door of the main portal, the date of 1898 appears, the completion date. The facade faces the land bridge dividing the lake and allows views of the entire lake.

== Tourist attraction ==
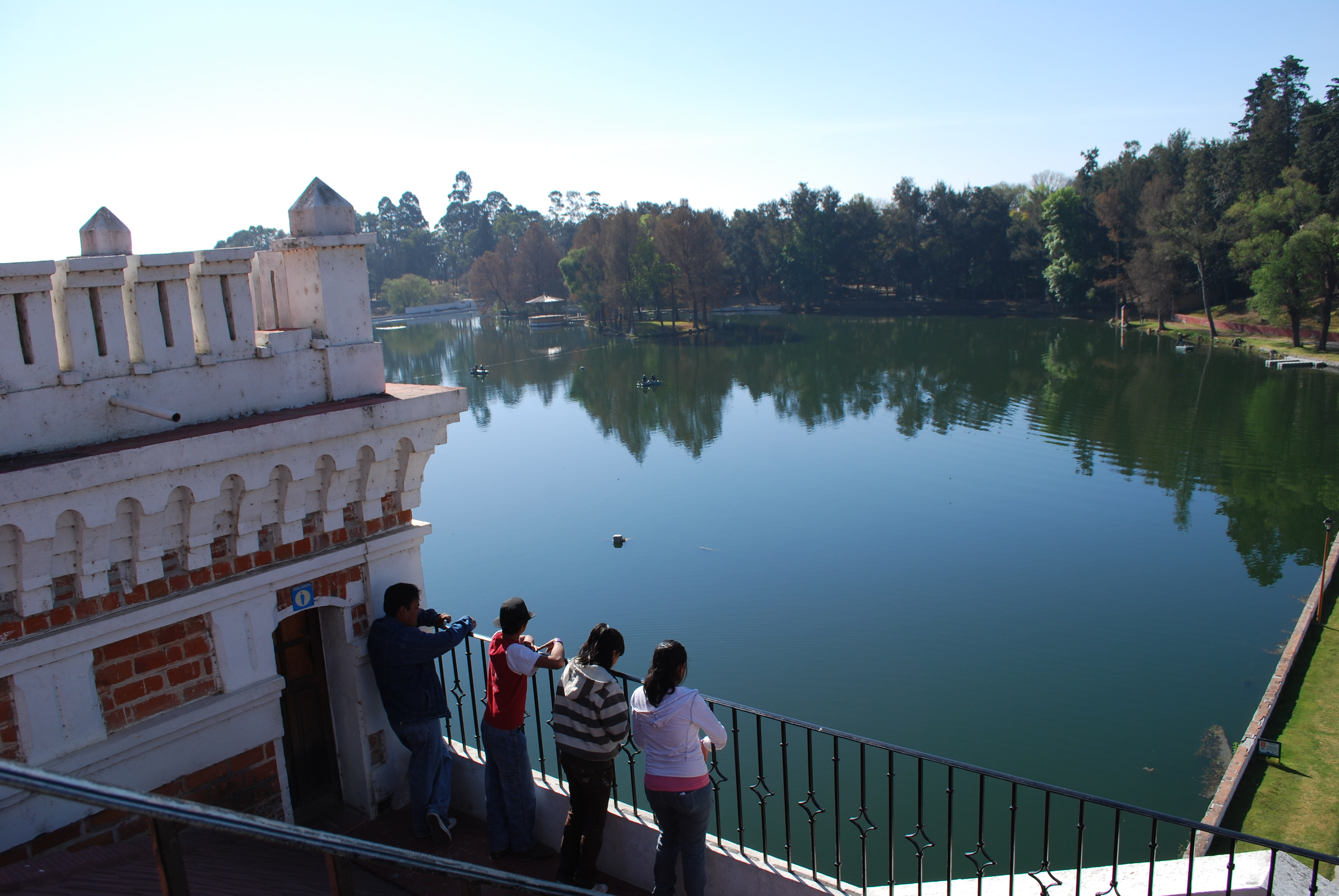
Overlooking the lake from the English style residence

This area of the hacienda was strictly private property until it was turned into a cultural and recreational center by Instituto para la Asistencia Pública del Estado de Puebla, a state agency. As such it promotes the main architectural elements (the main house and the residence hall) as well as the lake and the forest that surrounds it. The site offers activities such as sportfishing, camping, picnicking, and rents out facilities for events. The English style residence hall attracts many visitors. Its roof is open to the public, and its restaurant, named "El Castillo," specializes in trout dishes. The other popular activity is fishing in the waters behind the dam for trout and other species which are stocked by an organization called "Amatzcalli." A small grocery, a bait store, boat rental and fishing instruction are available.

== History ==
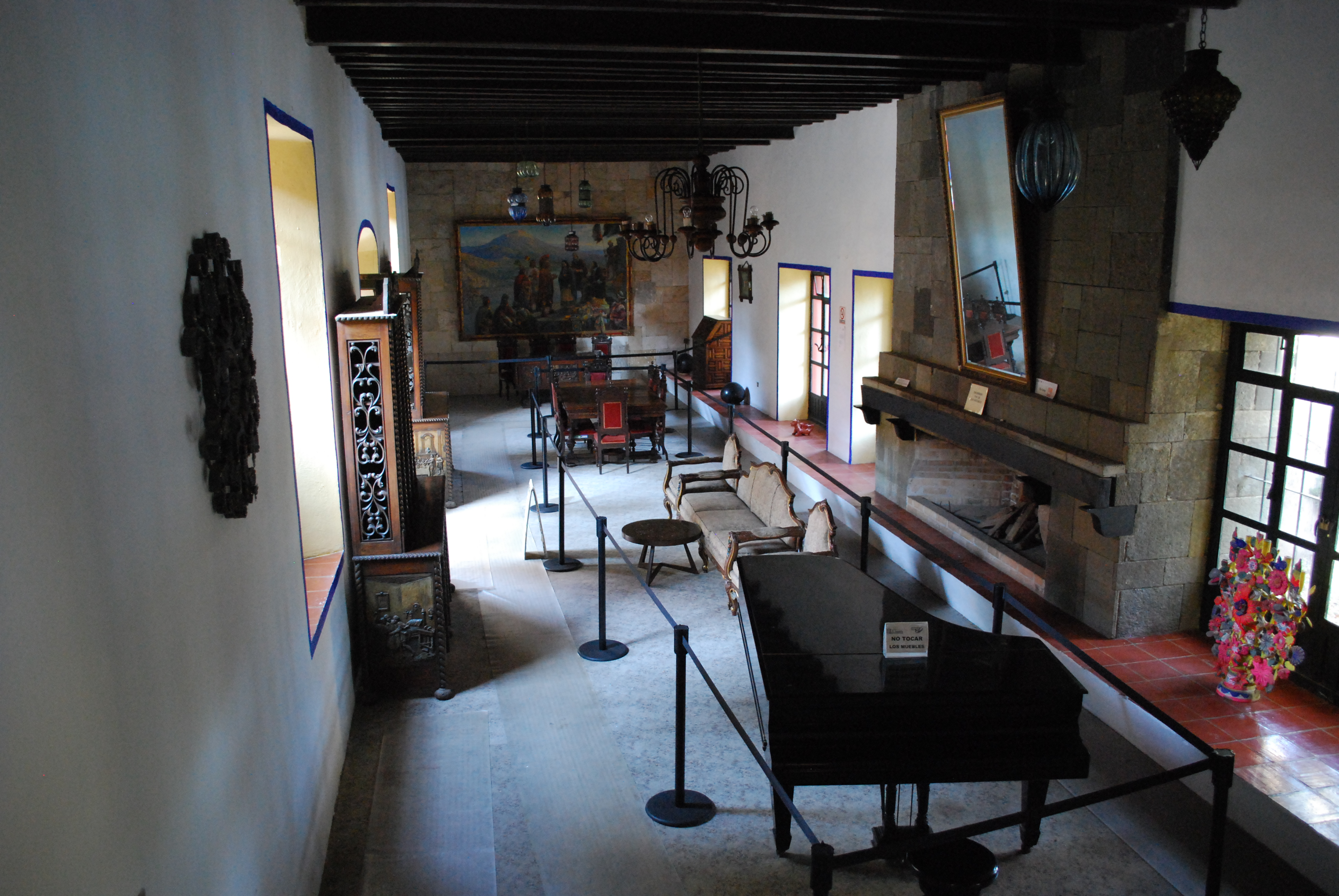
One of the halls of the site museum

The hacienda was created by Manuel Rodriguez de Pinillos y Lopez, who received the title of the first Marquis of Selva Nevada from Carlos III in 1777. However, this marquis never resided in it. It is one of a number of haciendas established in the valley which formed the basis of the local economy in the colonial period. The hacienda was originally established due to the natural resources, the availability of indigenous labor and its proximity to regional markets. The climate, abundance of water and fertile ground made it suitable for the production of grain. Initially, the hacienda raised corn and wheat on about 6,000 hectares, and included lands that are now incorporated into a number of ranches and villages in both Puebla and Tlaxcala states.

The hacienda eventually became the inheritance of the fourth Marchioness of Selva Negra, Soledad Gutierrez de Rivero Martinez de Pinillos. She had a daughter from her first marriage by the name of Mara Zavala y Gutierrez. In the 1820s, she was remarried, to an Englishman by the name of Thomas Gillow. Gillow was born in Liverpool, England in 1797 and arrived in Mexico in 1819, during the Mexican War of Independence. He became a fashionable jeweler and member of Mexico City society, allowing him to meet and then marry the Marchioness. Following his marriage, Gillow dedicated himself to running the family estate. After the marchioness died, Gillow married her daughter Mara. This may have been at least partly in order to end problems connected to the inheritance of the estate following the death of the marchioness' first husband. However, this marriage between Thomas and Mara was never formally sanctioned by the church. The union produced Eulogio Gillow.

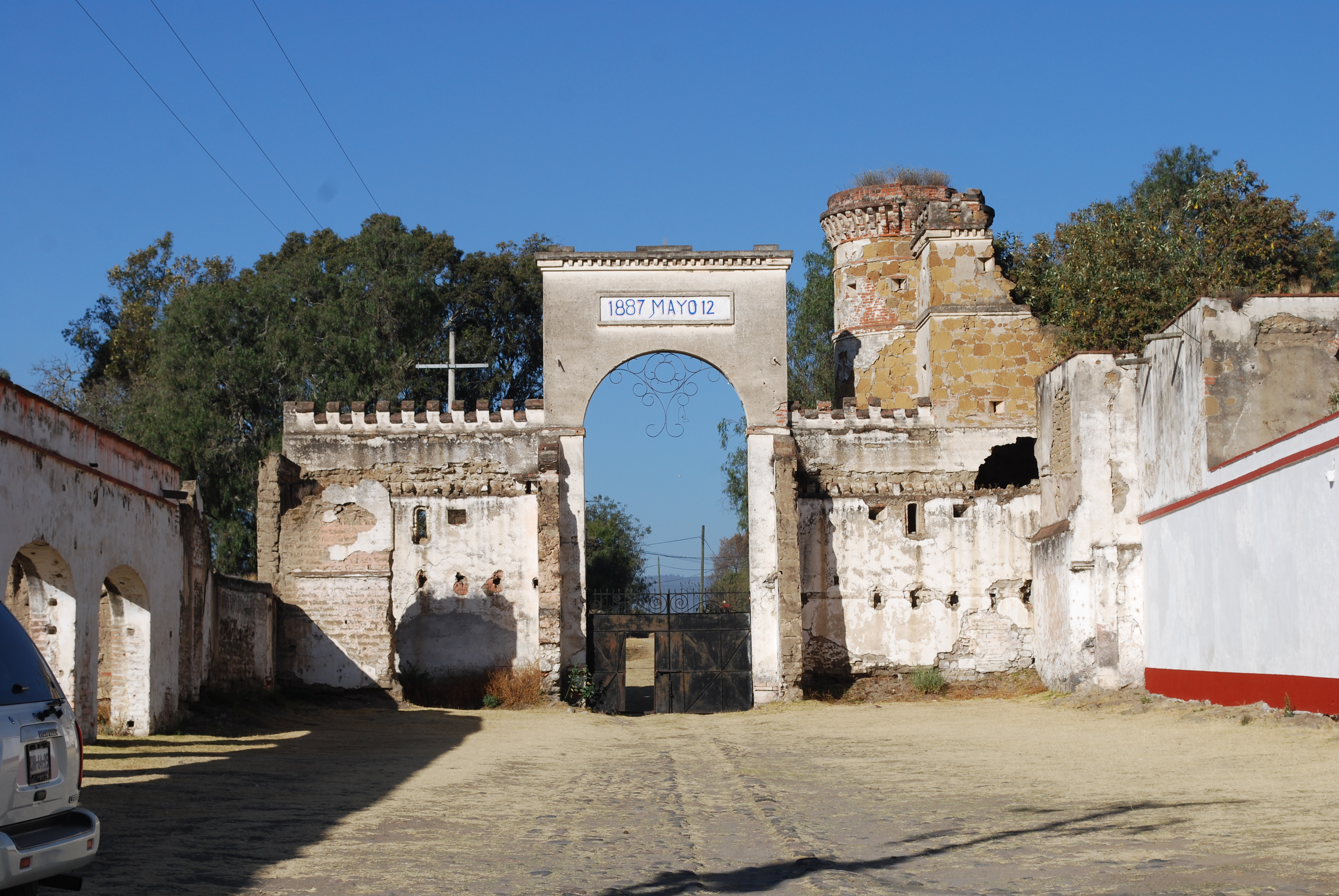
Gate at site entrance

When Mara died at sea in 1861, there were inheritance problems yet again, with Thomas Gillow receiving the Chautla Hacienda. He sold off a small portion of the estate in 1870, the first lands to be separated. When Thomas died in 1877, the remaining lands were inherited by Eulogio. Under Eulogio, the hacienda specialized in wheat and maguey production, and he worked to introduce modern technology and organizational methods.

=== Agricultural innovations, first hydroelectric plant in Latin America ===
Eulogio Gillow introduced electricity in 1903 by building Latin America's first hydroelectric power plant on the estate. His father had introduced the first metal plough, importing it from England, but it had worn so quickly that he later helped a Mr. Marshall establish an iron foundry in Puebla. Marshall went on to make a considerable fortune out of the manufacture and repair of farm and textile equipment. Eulogio also acquired other technology such as a threshing machine developed in the United States. Unfortunately, the machine did not work well at the Chautla Hacienda, because the grain produced was coarser than the U.S. varieties. The threshing machine was left to rust in a shed. Eulogio offered to donate the machine to the Smithsonian Institution, but only on condition that it be exhibited with a large sign saying, "This machine, awarded a gold medal in the Philadelphia exhibition, proved to be entirely useless in Mexico." Eulogio also worked to establish an agricultural college on the property, and built the English-style residence house on the dam to house teachers. It originally had a drawbridge, artificial lakes and formal, symmetrical gardens.

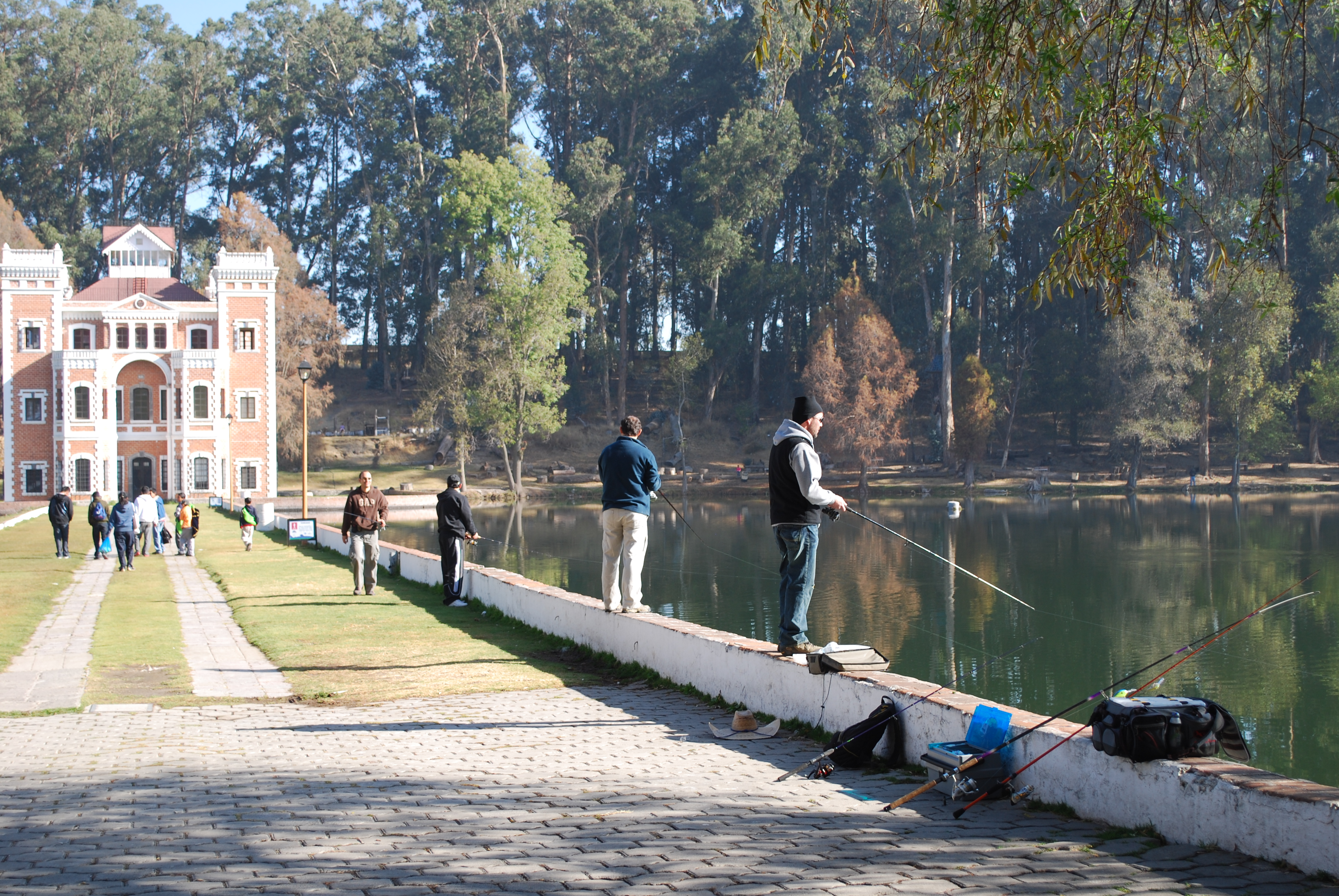
People fishing with the "castle" in the background

=== Expropriation during the Mexican Revolution ===
Eulogio was a priest, and a favorite in ecclesiastical and political circles. He was strongly allied with Porfirio Díaz, and officiated at his 1881 marriage. In 1887, Eulogio was appointed Bishop of Antequera (Oaxaca). Four years later, he became the first Archbishop of Antequera (city of Oaxaca). As Archbishop he worked to build schools, preserve colonial architecture and pushed for a railway connection between Mexico City and Oaxaca.

Eulogio lost most of the lands of the hacienda when the people of Mexico rose up against the Porfirio Díaz regime and the Hacienda feudal system during the Mexican Revolution (1910-1921). These lands were divided among local peasant farmers in 1914. A number of the hacienda's buildings were destroyed during the war, as well as furniture and administrative archives.

=== Public recreational and cultural center ===
Eulogio left for the United States and settled in Los Angeles. He returned in 1921 after the war and negotiated the return of 150 hectares of the former hacienda, which he received shortly before his death. His descendants sold off parts of this land, leaving the sixty hectares which were eventually sold to the state of Puebla. Since then it has been run as a recreational and cultural center. The site has been also used in the filming of Mexican telenovelas such as "Dulce desafío", "Pueblo chico, infierno grande" and "El Maleficio." In 2000, an organization called Amatzcalli restored the lake behind the dam for sportfishing, stocking it with trout and other species.
