= Ángel de Maldonado =

Bishop of Antequera from 1700 to 1728

Most Reverend Angel de Maldonado
- Bishop of Antequera
- Church: Catholic Church
- Diocese: Diocese of Antequera
- In office: 1700–1728
- Predecessor: Manuel Plácido de Quirós de Porras
- Successor: Francisco de Santiago y Calderón

Orders
- Consecration: 2 January 1701 by Francesco Acquaviva d'Aragona

Personal details
- Born: 1660 Ocaña, Spain
- Died: 17 April 1728 (age 68) Antequera, Oaxaca, Mexico

Angel de Maldonado, O. Cist. (1660–1728) was a Roman Catholic prelate who served as Bishop of Antequera (1700–1728).

== Biography ==
Angel de Maldonado was born in Ocaña, Spain in 1660 and ordained a priest in the Cistercian Order. On 21 June 1700, he was appointed during the papacy of Pope Innocent XII as Bishop of Antequera. On 2 January 1701, he was consecrated bishop by Francesco Acquaviva d'Aragona, Titular Archbishop of Larissa in Thessalia, with Gregorio Solórzano Castillo, Bishop of Ávila, and Francisco Zapata Vera y Morales, Titular Bishop of Dara, serving as co-consecrators. He served as Bishop of Antequera until his death on 17 April 1728.

While bishop, he was the principal consecrator of Juan Benito Garret y Arlovi, Bishop of Nicaragua (1710); and José Pérez de Lanciego Eguiluz y Mirafuentes, Archbishop of Mexico (1714).

== External links and additional sources ==
- Cheney, David M. "Archdiocese of Antequera, Oaxaca". Catholic-Hierarchy.org. (for Chronology of Bishops) ^{[self-published]}
- Chow, Gabriel. "Metropolitan Archdiocese of Antequera". GCatholic.org. (for Chronology of Bishops) ^{[self-published]}

Catholic Church titles
Preceded by Manuel Plácido de Quirós de Porras	Bishop of Antequera; 1700–1728	Succeeded by Francisco de Santiago y Calderón
