= José Domínguez =

José Domínguez may refer to:

- José Agustín Domínguez y Díaz (1790–1859), Mexican prelate of the Roman Catholic Church
- José Domínguez Bécquer (1805–1841), Spanish painter
- José Pantaleón Domínguez (1821–1894), Mexican politician
- José Domínguez Echenique (1900–1961), Chilean lawyer and conservative politician
- José Domínguez Rodríguez (1915–1986), Cuban prelate of the Roman Catholic Church
- José Domínguez Rial (1940–2000), Spanish footballer
- José Domínguez Abascal (1953–2024), Spanish engineer and politician
- José Antonio Domínguez (born 1960), Panamanian politician
- José Dominguez (born 1974), Portuguese footballer and manager
- José David Domínguez (born 1980), Spanish race walker
- José Domínguez (baseball) (born 1990), Dominican baseball pitcher
