= Texmelucan =

Texmelucan may refer to:

- San Martín Texmelucan, Puebla
- San Martín Texmelucan (municipality), Puebla
- San Lorenzo Texmelucan, Oaxaca
- Texmelucan Zapotec language
