= Antonio Dominguez =

Antonio Dominguez or Domínguez may refer to:

- Antonio Domínguez Ortiz (1909–2003), Spanish historian
- Antonio Dominguez Richa (1932–2020), Panamanian politician
- Antonio Domínguez (footballer) (born 1993), Spanish footballer
- Antonio Dominguez (The Bold and the Beautiful), fictional character
