= Pedro de Barrientos Lomelin =

Most Reverend Pedro de Barrientos Lomelin
- Bishop of Durango
- Church: Catholic Church
- Diocese: Diocese of Durango
- In office: 1655–1658
- Predecessor: Francisco Diego Díaz de Quintanilla y de Hevía y Valdés
- Successor: Juan Aguirre y Gorozpe

Orders
- Consecration: 16 July 1656 by Francisco Diego Díaz de Quintanilla y de Hevía y Valdés

Personal details
- Died: 27 December 1658 Durango, Mexico

Pedro de Barrientos Lomelin (died 27 December 1658) was a Roman Catholic prelate who served as Bishop of Durango (1655–1658).

== Biography ==
On 31 May 1655, Pedro de Barrientos Lomelin was appointed during the papacy of Pope Alexander VII as Bishop of Durango. On 16 July 1656, he was consecrated bishop by Francisco Diego Díaz de Quintanilla y de Hevía y Valdés, Bishop of Antequera, Oaxaca. He served as Bishop of Durango until his death on 27 December 1658. While bishop, he was the principal co-consecrator of Mateo de Sagade de Bugueyro, Archbishop of Mexico (1656) He also assisted in the consecration of Nicolás de la Torre Muñoz, Bishop of Santiago de Cuba (1651).

== See also ==
- Catholic Church in Mexico

== External links and additional sources ==
- Cheney, David M. "Archdiocese of Durango". Catholic-Hierarchy.org. (for Chronology of Bishops) ^{[self-published]}
- Chow, Gabriel. "Archdiocese of Durango (Mexico)". GCatholic.org. (for Chronology of Bishops) ^{[self-published]}

Catholic Church titles
| Preceded by Francisco Diego Díaz de Quintanilla y de Hevía y Valdés | Bishop of Durango; 1655–1658 | Succeeded by Juan Aguirre y Gorozpe |
