= Tlaltenango =

Tlaltenango, Mexican toponym, may mean:

- Tlaltenango de Sánchez Román, Zacatecas
- Tlaltenango, Puebla
- Tlaltenango, Morelos
