= Manuel Isidoro Perez Sánchez =

Spanish bishop

Manuel Isidoro Perez Sánchez (born 1776 in Pozo de Guadalajara) was a Spanish clergyman and bishop for the Roman Catholic Archdiocese of Antequera, Oaxaca. He was ordained in 1820. He was appointed bishop in 1820. He died in 1840.
