= Gregorio Jose de Omaña y Sotomayor =

Gregorio Jose de Omaña y Sotomayor (born 1739 in Santiago Tilapa) was a Mexican clergyman and bishop for the Roman Catholic Archdiocese of Antequera, Oaxaca. He was ordained in 1792. He was appointed bishop in 1793. He died in 1797.
