= Arturo Lona Reyes =

Mexican Catholic bishop (1925–2020)

- Bishop of Tehuantepec
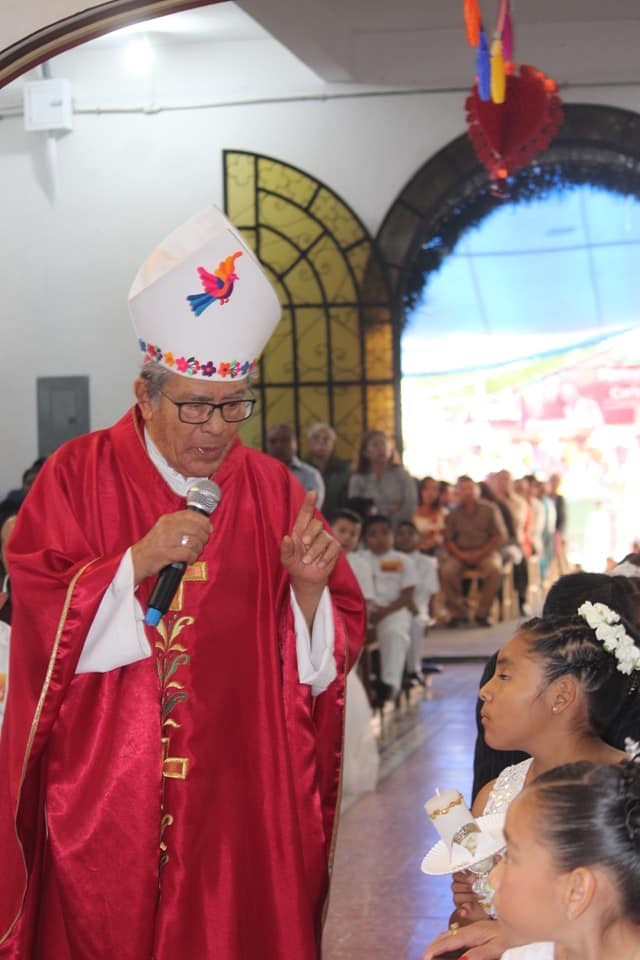
- Arturo Lona Reyes in June 2019
- Church: Catholic Church
- Diocese: Diocese of Tehuantepec
- In office: 4 May 1971 – 25 November 2000
- Predecessor: José de Jesús Clemens Alba Palacios
- Successor: Felipe Padilla Cardona

Orders
- Ordination: 15 August 1952
- Consecration: 15 August 1971 by Manuel Jerónimo Yerena y Camarena

Personal details
- Born: 1 November 1925 Aguascalientes, Aguascalientes, Mexico
- Died: 31 October 2020 (aged 94) Lagunas, Oaxaca, Mexico

Arturo Lona Reyes (1 November 1925 – 31 October 2020) was a Mexican bishop who served as the Catholic bishop from Tehuantepec, Oaxaca, Mexico. He served in his position for 30 years before resigning from his diocese in 2001.

== Early life and career ==
Lona Reyes was born on 1 November 1925, in the state of Aguascalientes. He became a Roman Catholic priest in 1952. Reyes became famous for wearing a white shirt, blue jeans and huaraches and a large wooden cross on his chest.

Lona Reyes joined the church in Tehuantepec in 1971, where he took a radical view on the social situation in the city. His teachings and beliefs were based on those espoused in the Second Vatican Council of 1962 and included seeking a "popular church", able to assist the poor and facilitate social justice. In 1972 he presided over the Episcopal Commission for Indigenous People. To benefit local producers he established two agricultural co-operatives—one exporting organic coffee to Europe and another to sell sesame—with profits shared equally between members. He was famous for providing advice to indigenous peoples resisting mining, wind and timber projects on their land.

On 29 June 1995, Lona Reyes was the victim of an assassination attempt by gunmen. He is believed to have been targeted because of his role as chairman of the Tepeyac Human Rights Centre in Tehuantepec. Throughout his career he was physically attacked 11 times.

== Resignation request ==
Lona Reyes was asked to resign in 1998. This was the culmination of several years of being accused of being a Marxist guerrilla and murderer. His opponents accused him of engaging in gun-running, fomenting political instability and aiding guerrilla movements. These accusations stemmed from Lona Reyes' support of the Coalition of Workers, Peasants, and Students of the Isthmus (COCEI), which the government believed directly influenced the group's rapid growth. For instance, in May 1979, Lona Reyes was asked by families of COECEI members taken prisoner to assist in securing their release, something the government did not look favorably upon. In response to the apparently close relationship between Lona Reyes and COCEI, the government closed churches and expelled diocesan workers. The government, however, failed to provide any evidence to show a direct link between Lona Reyes and the actions of the COCEI.

In response to the accusations Lona Reyes claimed he was being asked to resign due to his support for liberation theology, which advocated economic and political freedom as a means to ensure spiritual freedom. Lona Reyes went on to state Pope John Paul II and Archbishop Girolamo Prigione, the Apostolic Delegate to Mexico, were attempting to replace all Mexican bishops that supported liberation theology, stating that 86 of 100 of the bishops at that time had been replaced. Lona Reyes went on to proclaim that he would only resign if the Pope requested it of him personally in the presence of two witnesses, later stating:

I have been putting up with humiliating behavior from these people for 27 years, then they suddenly requested my resignation, but I did not agree. I will not resign. It would be like betraying my people, the priests, and nuns, the women, men, young people, and children

In response to Lona Reyes's accusations, Apostolic Nuncio Archbishop Justo Mullor cited canonical law which stated a bishop was to resign at the age of 75, which Lona Reyes was approaching. Further accusations were made by Prigione, stating Lona Reyes had failed to submit reports to the Vatican since 1971. Lona Reyes resigned as bishop in 2001, having reached the age limit of 75.

== Later career and death ==
Lona Reyes was appointed bishop emeritus in 2000. In 2008 he received the 16th Don Sergio Méndez Arceo National Human Rights Award.

Lona Reyes was admitted to Médica Azul hospital, in Lagunas, Oaxaca, with a spinal complaint in mid-October 2020. On the third day in hospital he was diagnosed with COVID-19 during the COVID-19 pandemic in Mexico, which was dangerous due to his pre-existing diabetes. He died from COVID-19 on 31 October 2020, in the Médica Azul hospital of Lagunas, Oaxaca, the day before his 95th birthday. He was cremated the same day as his death and his ashes placed in a glass cabinet in front of the main altar of Tehuantepec Cathedral until his funeral on 3 November.
