= Apolonio Méndez Meneses =

Mexican politician

- Born: 9 February 1946 (age 80); San Martín Texmelucan, Puebla, Mexico
- Occupation: Politician
- Political party: PAN

Apolonio Méndez Meneses (born 9 February 1946) is a Mexican politician affiliated with the National Action Party (PAN). In the 2006 general election he was elected to the Chamber of Deputies to represent Puebla's 5th district during the 60th session of Congress.
