= Juan Aguirre =

Juan Aguirre may refer to:

- Juan Aguirre (musician) (born 1965), Basque musician and songwriter
- Juan Aguirre (rower) (born 1970), Spanish rower
- Juan Felipe Aguirre (born 1996), Colombian footballer
- Juan Pedro Aguirre (1781–1837), Argentine revolutionary and politician
- Juan Bautista Aguirre (1725–1786), Ecuadorian poet and writer
- Juan Aguirre y Gorozpe (1599–1671), Roman Catholic prelate
- Memo Aguirre (Juan Guillermo Aguirre, born 1952), Chilean singer and musician
