= Mateo de Sagade de Bugueyro =

Spanish Catholic prelate (1605-1672)

Most Reverend Mateo de Sagade de Bugueyro
- Archbishop (personal title) of Cartagena
- Church: Catholic Church
- Archdiocese: Archdiocese of Cartagena
- In office: 1664–1672
- Predecessor: Juan Bravo Lasprilla
- Successor: Francisco de Rojas-Borja y Artés

Orders
- Consecration: 25 July 1656 by Juan Merlo de la Fuente

Personal details
- Born: 1605 Pontevedra, Spain
- Died: 28 August 1672 (aged 66–67) Cartagena, Spain

Mateo de Sagade de Bugueyro also Mateo Segade Bugueiro or Mateo Sagade Bugueyro (1605 – 28 August 1672) was a Spanish Catholic prelate who served as Archbishop (Personal Title) of Cartagena (1664–1672) and Archbishop of Mexico (1655–1664).

== Biography ==
Mateo de Sagade de Bugueyro was born in Pontevedra, Spain. On 14 May 1655, he selected by the King of Spain and confirmed by Pope Alexander VII as Archbishop of Mexico. On 25 July 1656, he was consecrated bishop by Juan Merlo de la Fuente, Bishop of Comayagua with Pedro de Barrientos Lomelin, Bishop of Durango serving as co-consecrator. On 28 January 1664, he was appointed by Pope Alexander VII as Archbishop (Personal Title) of Cartagena. He served as Archbishop of Cartagena until his death on 28 August 1672.

== Episcopal succession ==
While bishop, he was the principal consecrator of:

- Juan Alonso de Cuevas y Davalos, Bishop of Antequera, Oaxaca (1658);
- Juan Aguirre y Gorozpe, Bishop of Durango (1660); and
- Antonio Fernández del Campo Angulo y Velasco, Bishop of Tui (1666).

== External links and additional sources ==
- Cheney, David M. "Archdiocese of México". Catholic-Hierarchy.org. (for Chronology of Bishops) ^{[self-published]}
- Chow, Gabriel. "Metropolitan Archdiocese of México". GCatholic.org. (for Chronology of Bishops) ^{[self-published]}
- Cheney, David M. "Diocese of Cartagena". Catholic-Hierarchy.org. (for Chronology of Bishops) ^{[self-published]}
- Chow, Gabriel. "Diocese of Cartagena". GCatholic.org. (for Chronology of Bishops) ^{[self-published]}

Catholic Church titles
Preceded by Marcelo Lopez de Azcona	Archbishop of Mexico; 1655–1664	Succeeded by Juan Alonso de Cuevas y Davalos
Preceded by Juan Bravo Lasprilla	Archbishop (Personal Title) of Cartagena; 1664–1672	Succeeded by Francisco de Rojas-Borja y Artés
