= Bartolomé de Ledesma =

Spanish Roman Catholic prelate

Most Reverend Bartolomé de Ledesma
- Bishop of Antequera, Oaxaca
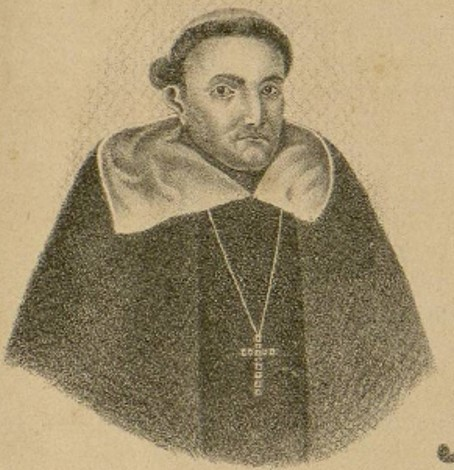
- Church: Catholic Church
- Diocese: Diocese of Antequera, Oaxaca
- In office: 1583–1604
- Predecessor: Bernardo de Albuquerque
- Successor: Baltazar de Cobarrubias y Múñoz
- Previous post: Bishop of Panamá (1580–1583)

Orders
- Consecration: June 3, 1583 by Diego de Romano y Govea

Personal details
- Born: Salamanca, Spain
- Died: February 16, 1604

Bartolomé de Ledesma, O.P. (died February 16, 1604) was a Roman Catholic prelate who served as Bishop of Antequera, Oaxaca (1583–1604) and Bishop of Panamá (1580–1583).

== Biography ==
Bartolomé de Ledesma was born on February 16, 1604, in Salamanca, Spain and ordained a priest in the Order of Preachers. On October 20, 1580, Pope Gregory XIII appointed him Bishop of Panamá (some sources state that he did not accept the nomination). On June 3, 1583, he was consecrated bishop by Diego de Romano y Govea, Bishop of Tlaxcala (Puebla de los Angeles). As there was no official governor during his term as bishop of Panama, he was instrumental in governing the province with the Audencia Real (high court). He reached out to the Cimarrónes (free blacks) who were living outside of the Crown's jurisdiction and facilitated their incorporation into the colony. In 1581, a treaty was signed between the Cimarrónes which gave them the land which they possessed and allowed them to found and settle the city of Pacora, near Panama City, as a commercial center. He also helped to lessen congestion in Panama City by founding the town of Penonomé and establishing parishes in Natá and Olá. In June 1584, Pope Gregory XIII appointed him the third Bishop of Antequera, Oaxaca. In 1585, he attended the Third Mexican Provincial Council.

Ledesma died on February 16, 1604.

== External links and additional sources ==
- Cheney, David M. "Archdiocese of Panamá". Catholic-Hierarchy.org. (for Chronology of Bishops) ^{[self-published]}
- Chow, Gabriel. "Metropolitan Archdiocese of Panamá". GCatholic.org. (for Chronology of Bishops) ^{[self-published]}
- Cheney, David M. "Archdiocese of Antequera, Oaxaca". Catholic-Hierarchy.org. (for Chronology of Bishops) ^{[self-published]}
- Chow, Gabriel. "Metropolitan Archdiocese of Antequera". GCatholic.org. (for Chronology of Bishops) ^{[self-published]}

Religious titles
Preceded by Manuel de Mercado Aldrete	Bishop of Panamá; 1580–1583	Succeeded by Bartolomé Martinez Menacho y Mesa
Preceded by Bernardo de Albuquerque	Bishop of Antequera, Oaxaca; 1583–1604	Succeeded by Baltazar de Cobarrubias y Múñoz
