= Isidoro Sariñara y Medina Cuenca =

Isidoro Sariñara y Medina Cuenca (born 1631 in Mexico City) was a Mexican clergyman and bishop for the Roman Catholic Archdiocese of Antequera, Oaxaca. He was ordained in 1683. He was appointed bishop in 1684. He died in 1696.
