= Tomás de Monterroso =

Most Reverend Tomás de Monterroso
- Bishop of Antequera, Oaxaca
- Church: Catholic Church
- Diocese: Diocese of Antequera, Oaxaca
- In office: 1664–1678
- Predecessor: Juan Alonso de Cuevas y Davalos
- Successor: Nicolás Ortiz del Puerto y Colmenares Salgado

Personal details
- Died: 1678 Oaxaca

Tomás de Monterroso, O.P. (died 1678) was a Roman Catholic prelate who served as Bishop of Antequera, Oaxaca (1664–1678).

== Biography ==
Tomás de Monterroso was ordained a priest in the Order of Preachers. On 23 June 1664, Tomás de Monterroso was appointed during the papacy of Pope Alexander VII as Bishop of Antequera, Oaxaca. He served as Bishop of Antequera, Oaxaca until his death on 26 January 1678.

== External links and additional sources ==
- Cheney, David M. "Archdiocese of Antequera, Oaxaca". Catholic-Hierarchy.org. (for Chronology of Bishops) ^{[self-published]}
- Chow, Gabriel. "Metropolitan Archdiocese of Antequera". GCatholic.org. (for Chronology of Bishops) ^{[self-published]}

Catholic Church titles
Preceded by Juan Alonso de Cuevas y Davalos	Bishop of Antequera, Oaxaca; 1664–1678	Succeeded by Nicolás Ortiz del Puerto y Colmenares Salgado
