= Miguel Anselmo Álvarez de Abreu y Valdéz =

Miguel Anselmo Álvarez de Abreu y Valdéz (born 1711 in La Laguna) was a Spanish clergyman and bishop for the Roman Catholic Archdiocese of Antequera, Oaxaca. He was ordained in 1749. He was appointed bishop in 1751. He died in 1774.
