= Juan Alonso de Cuevas y Dávalos =

Most Reverend Juan Alonso de Cuevas y Dávalos
- Archbishop of Mexico
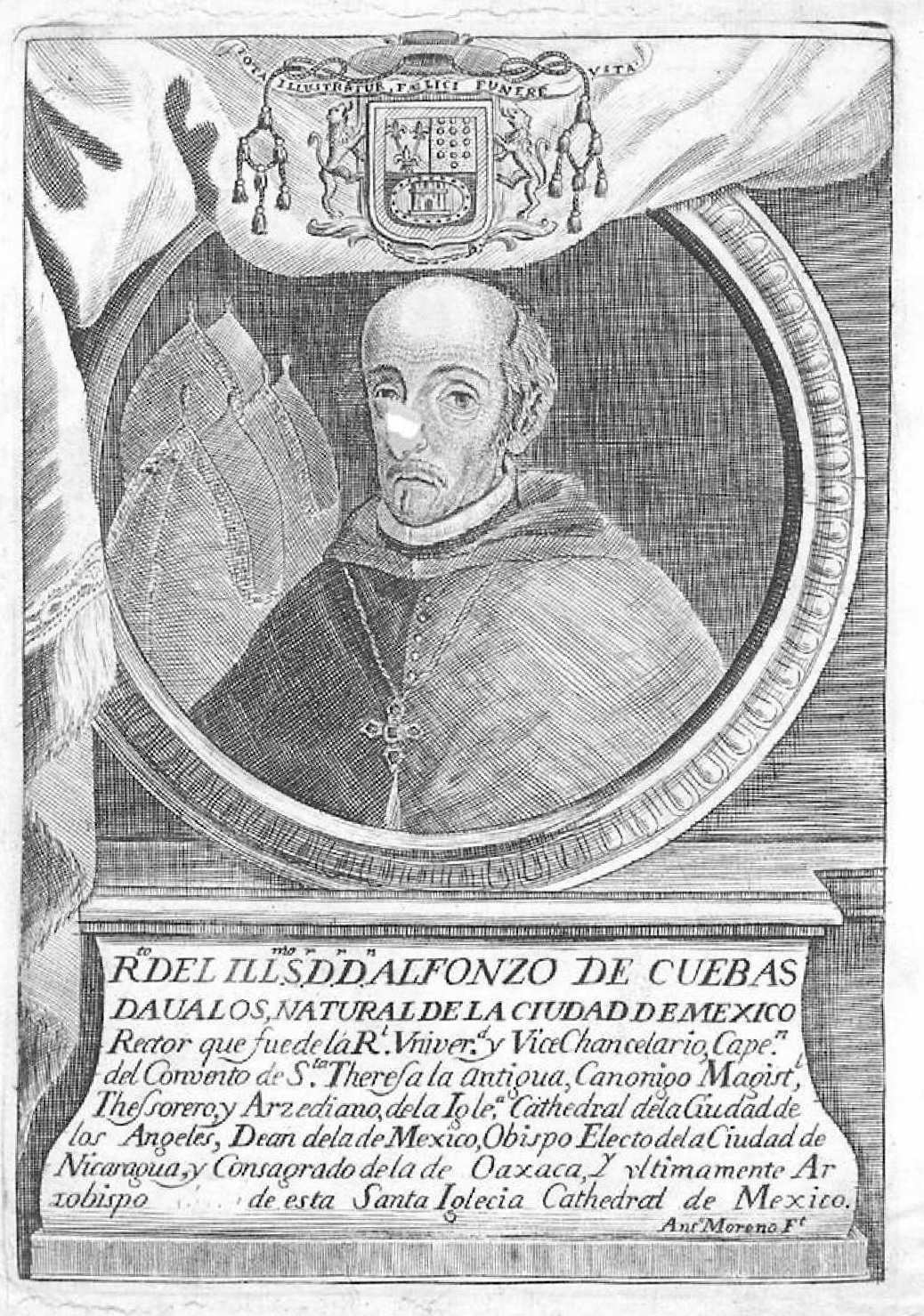
- Church: Catholic Church
- Archdiocese: Archdiocese of Mexico
- In office: 1664–1665
- Predecessor: Mateo de Sagade de Bugueyro
- Successor: Marcos Ramírez de Prado y Ovando

Orders
- Consecration: 13 September 1658 by Mateo de Sagade de Bugueyro

Personal details
- Born: 25 November 1590 New Spain
- Died: 2 September 1665 (aged 74) New Spain

Juan Alonso de Cuevas y Dávalos (25 November 1590 – 2 September 1665) was a Catholic prelate who served as Archbishop of Mexico (1664–1665) and Bishop of Antequera, Oaxaca (1658–1664).

== Biography ==
Juan Alonso de Cuevas y Dávalos was born in New Spain. On 19 January 1658, he selected by the King of Spain and confirmed by Pope Alexander VII as Bishop of Antequera, Oaxaca. On 13 September 1658, he was consecrated bishop by Mateo de Sagade de Bugueyro, Archbishop of Mexico. On 28 April 1664, he was appointed by Pope Alexander VII as Archbishop of Mexico and installed on 15 November 1664. He served as Archbishop of Mexico until his death on 2 September 1665. While bishop, he was the principal consecrator of Marcos de Torres y Rueda, Bishop of Yucatán (1645).

== See also ==
- Catholic Church in Mexico

== External links and additional sources ==
- Cheney, David M. "Archdiocese of Antequera, Oaxaca". Catholic-Hierarchy.org. (for Chronology of Bishops) ^{[self-published]}
- Chow, Gabriel. "Metropolitan Archdiocese of Antequera". GCatholic.org. (for Chronology of Bishops) ^{[self-published]}
- Cheney, David M. "Archdiocese of México". Catholic-Hierarchy.org. (for Chronology of Bishops) ^{[self-published]}
- Chow, Gabriel. "Metropolitan Archdiocese of México". GCatholic.org. (for Chronology of Bishops) ^{[self-published]}

Catholic Church titles
Preceded by Francisco Diego Díaz de Quintanilla y de Hevía y Valdés	Bishop of Antequera, Oaxaca; 1658–1664	Succeeded by Tomás de Monterroso
Preceded by Mateo de Sagade de Bugueyro	Archbishop of Mexico; 1664–1665	Succeeded by Marcos Ramírez de Prado y Ovando
