= Nicolás Ortiz del Puerto y Colmenares Salgado =

Most Reverend Nicolás Ortiz del Puerto y Colmenares Salgado
- Bishop of Antequera
- Church: Catholic Church
- Diocese: Diocese of Antequera, Oaxaca
- In office: 1678–1681
- Predecessor: Tomás de Monterroso
- Successor: Isidoro Sariñana y Medina Cuenca

Orders
- Consecration: 14 January 1680 by Manuel Fernández de Santa Cruz y Sahagún

Personal details
- Born: 1620 Santa Catalina Minas
- Died: 13 August 1681 (aged 60–61) Antequera, Oaxaca, Mexico

Nicolás Ortiz del Puerto y Colmenares Salgado (1620 – 13 August 1681) was a Roman Catholic prelate who served as Bishop of Antequera (1678–1681).

== Biography ==
Nicolás Ortiz del Puerto y Colmenares Salgado was born in Santa Catalina Minas. On 3 October 1678, he was appointed during the papacy of Pope Alexander VIII as Bishop of Antequera. On 14 January 1680, he was consecrated bishop by Manuel Fernández de Santa Cruz y Sahagún, Bishop of Tlaxcala. He served as Bishop of Antequera' until his death on 13 August 1681.

== External links and additional sources ==
- Cheney, David M. "Archdiocese of Antequera, Oaxaca". Catholic-Hierarchy.org. (for Chronology of Bishops) ^{[self-published]}
- Chow, Gabriel. "Metropolitan Archdiocese of Antequera". GCatholic.org. (for Chronology of Bishops) ^{[self-published]}

Catholic Church titles
Preceded by Tomás de Monterroso	Bishop of Antequera; 1678–1681	Succeeded by Isidoro Sariñana y Medina Cuenca
