= Antonio Dominguez Richa =

Panamanian politician and diplomat (1932–2020)

Antonio "Tony" Dominguez
- Born: May 16, 1932
- Died: April 15, 2020 (aged 87)
- Education: Notre Dame
- Occupations: Vice Minister (1968); District Councilor (1968); Director of Immigration (1989-1994); Presidential Advisor (1999-2004); Vice Deputy to the Central America Parliament (2004-2006)
- Political party: Panameñista Party
- Board member of: National Bank of Panama, Interoceanic Region Authority (ARI) Chamber of Commerce, Industry, and Agriculture Banco General Grupo Melo S.A.
- Spouse: Carmen Alvarez
- Children: 6

Antonio Dominguez Richa (also known as Antonio "Tony" Dominguez) was a Panamanian politician, businessman, and philanthropist. He was the district councilor (position no longer exists), director of immigration of Panama, a vice deputy to the Central America Parliament, and a founding member of the Panameñista party. He was also the owner of a business that went by the name of Villa de Caracas. He was married to Carmen "Carmensita" Alvarez and had six children, including Antonio Dominguez Alvarez and Jose Antonio Dominguez.

== Politics ==
Antonio Dominguez was inspired by Arnulfo Arias which lead him to join the Panameñista Party. He was viceminister during Arnulfo's presidency in 1968. Dominguez was exiled due to his opposition to the military dictator, Omar Torrijos. During his exile he served as the president of the chamber of commerce industries and agriculture, the only president to have done so outside of the country. He later gave his support to both Panameñista presidential candidates, Guillermo Endara and Mireya Moscoso in the national elections. During Endara's presidency (1989), Dominguez was appointed as the head of the immigration department. During Moscoso's presidency (1999), he was appointed as chief of staff to the president. He was also a board member of the National Bank of Panama and the Interoceanic Region Authority. His son, Jose Antonio Dominguez, has continued in his political footsteps as minister of public affairs, deputy in the national assembly of Panama, and ambassador to Taiwan (China). His other son, Antonio Dominguez Jr. reached the office of board of director of the Panama Canal.

== Philanthropy ==
In 1955, alongside other young Panamanian men, he founded the Active 20-30 Club chapter in Panama, who has historically helped run the national telethon, who raises funds yearly for charitable causes.
