= Víctor Hugo Islas =

Mexican lawyer and politician

- Born: Adrían Víctor Hugo Islas Hernández; 8 September 1951 (age 74); Puebla, Puebla, Mexico
- Occupations: Lawyer and politician
- Political party: PRI

Adrían Víctor Hugo Islas Hernández (born 8 September 1951) is a Mexican lawyer and politician affiliated with the Institutional Revolutionary Party (PRI).

Islas Hernández was born in the city of Puebla on 8 September 1951. in 1975 he graduated with a degree in law from the Autonomous University of Puebla (BUAP).

He has been elected to the Chamber of Deputies on three occasions: in the 1985 mid-terms, for Puebla's 5th district (53rd Congress); in the 1994 general election, for Puebla's 3rd (56th Congress); and in the 2003 mid-terms, for Puebla's 5th. (59th Congress)

In addition, from 1997 to 2000, he served in the Senate for the state of Puebla (57th Congress).
