= Bartolomé de Benavente y Benavides =

Roman Catholic prelate

Most Reverend Bartolomé de Benavente y Benavides
- Bishop of Antequera, Oaxaca
- Church: Catholic Church
- Diocese: Diocese of Antequera, Oaxaca
- In office: 1639–1652
- Predecessor: Leonel de Cervantes y Caravajal
- Successor: Francisco Diego Díaz de Quintanilla y de Hevía y Valdés

Orders
- Consecration: 1640 by Pedro de Villagómez Vivanco

Personal details
- Born: 24 August 1594 Madrid, Spain
- Died: 26 July 1652 (aged 57) Antequera, Oaxaca, Mexico

Bartolomé de Benavente y Benavides (24 August 1594 – 26 July 1652) was a Roman Catholic prelate who served as Bishop of Antequera, Oaxaca (1639–1652).

== Biography ==
Bartolomé de Benavente y Benavides was born in Madrid, Spain on 24 August 1594. On 27 June 1639, he was appointed during the papacy of Pope Urban VIII as Bishop of Antequera, Oaxaca. In 1640, he was consecrated bishop by Pedro de Villagómez Vivanco, Archbishop of Lima, with Antonio Corderiña Vega, Bishop of Santa Marta, and Francisco de la Serna, Bishop of Popayán, serving as co-consecrators. He served as Bishop of Antequera until his death on 26 July 1652. While bishop, he was the principal consecrator of Bartolomé González Soltero, Bishop of Santiago de Guatemala (1643).

== External links and additional sources ==
- Cheney, David M. "Archdiocese of Antequera, Oaxaca". Catholic-Hierarchy.org. (for Chronology of Bishops) ^{[self-published]}
- Chow, Gabriel. "Metropolitan Archdiocese of Antequera". GCatholic.org. (for Chronology of Bishops) ^{[self-published]}

Catholic Church titles
Preceded by Leonel de Cervantes y Caravajal	Bishop of Antequera, Oaxaca; 1639–1652	Succeeded by Francisco Diego Díaz de Quintanilla y de Hevía y Valdés
