= Antonio Bergosa y Jordán =

Roman Catholic bishop in Spain

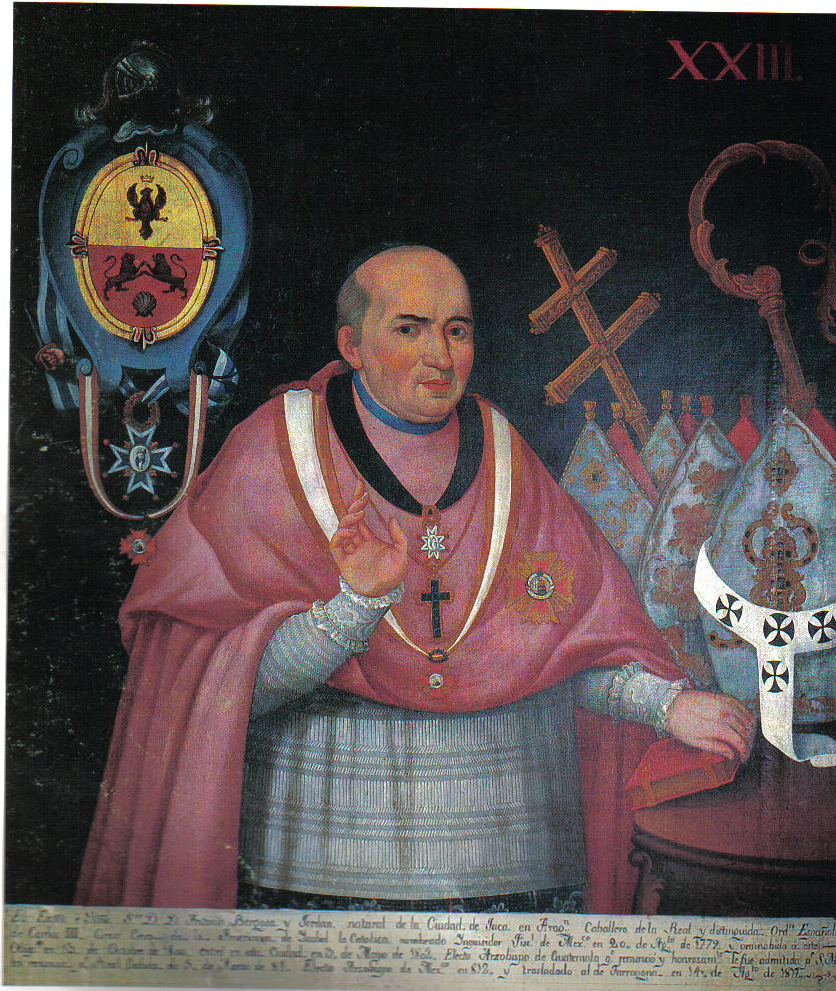
Antonio Bergosa y Jordán

Antonio Bergosa y Jordán (born 1748 in Jaca) was a Spanish clergyman and bishop for the Roman Catholic Archdiocese of Antequera, Oaxaca. He was ordained in 1773. He was appointed bishop in 1801. He died in 1819. He later became Archbishop of Tarragona.
