= Antonio Mantecón e Ibañez =

Mexican Catholic clergyman

Antonio Mantecón e Ibañez (born 1784 in Oaxaca City) was a Mexican clergyman and bishop for the Roman Catholic Archdiocese of Antequera, Oaxaca. He was ordained in 1821. He was appointed bishop in 1844. He died in 1852.
