= Eulogio Gillow y Zavalza =

His Excellency, The Most Reverend Eulogio Gillow y Zavala
- Archbishop of Antequera, Oaxaca
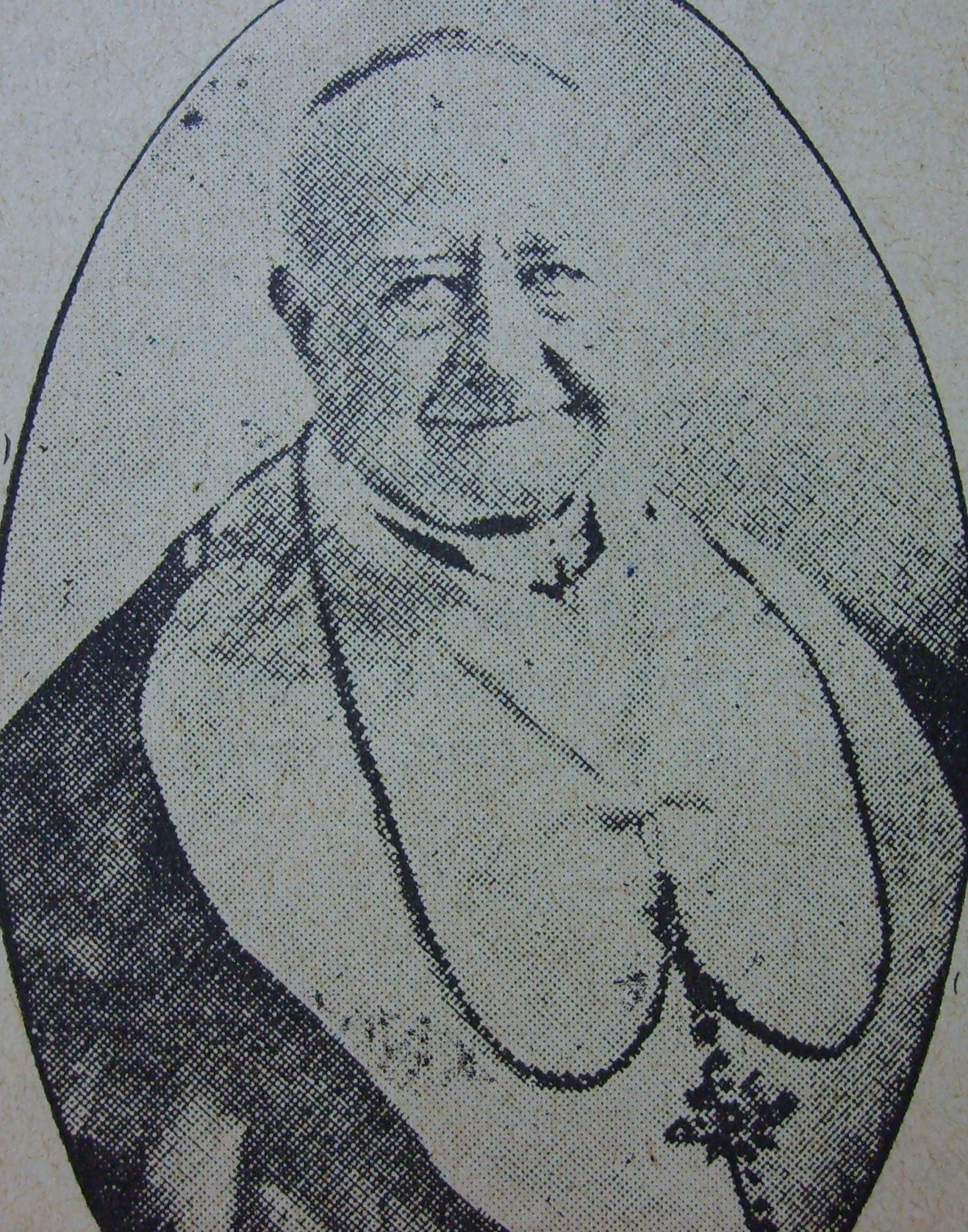
- Portrait of the Archbishop
- Church: Catholic Church
- Archdiocese: Archdiocese of Antequera, Oaxaca
- In office: 23 June 1891 – 19 May 1922
- Predecessor: Vicente Fermín Márquez y Carrizosa (as Bishop of Antequera)
- Successor: José Othón Núñez y Zárate
- Previous posts: Bishop of Antequera, Oaxaca (1887-1891)

Orders
- Ordination: 17 December 1865
- Consecration: 31 July 1887
- Rank: Archbishop

Personal details
- Born: Eulogio Gregorio Clemente Gillow y Zavala; 11 March 1841 Puebla, Puebla, Mexican Republic
- Died: 19 May 1922 (aged 81) Mexico
- Education: College of Aalst; Université de Namur; Pontifical Gregorian University; Sapienza University of Rome

Eulogio Gregorio Clemente Gillow y Zavala was the first archbishop of the Roman Catholic Archdiocese of Antequera, Oaxaca located in Oaxaca de Juarez, Oaxaca, Mexico. He was the key cleric in President Porfirio Díaz's policy of conciliation with the Roman Catholic Church, which kept the anticlerical articles of the liberal Constitution of 1857 in place but suspended their implementation.

== Life ==
Born at Puebla, Mexico in 1841, he was the member of a wealthy and socially prominent family, the son of an English Catholic from Lancashire, Thomas Gillow, who immigrated to Mexico in 1819, and María Zavala y Gutiérrez, who inherited the title of the Marchioness of Selva Nevada. Originally Thomas Gillow was a jeweler, but he became a successful agricultural businessman, managing his wife's estates, and keenly interested in improving farming methods in Mexico. In 1851, Gillow father and son attended The Great Exhibition in London; and young Eulogio remained in England for education, attending the Jesuit college of Stonyhurst.

After Stonyhurst, Gillow continued his studies at the College of Aalst and the Université de Namur, both in Belgium. This was followed by studies at the Pontifical Gregorian University and Sapienza University of Rome.

He went to Rome in 1862, and gained an audience with Pope Pius IX, who encouraged him to study for the priesthood. Gillow was in Rome for the celebrations for Maximilian of Habsburg as he prepared to go to Mexico to become Emperor at the invitation of Mexican conservatives. Gillow returned to Mexico during Maximilian's Second Mexican Empire and was ordained at the cathedral in Puebla in 1869. He had impressed Pius XI and returned to Rome to serve as the pope's private chamberlain.

During the First Vatican Council, Gillow was a theological adviser to the archbishop of Oaxaca. Before his return to Mexico, Gillow was appointed by the pope to an office that connected him directly with the Roman Curia rather than the episcopal hierarchy in Mexico.

He inherited the Chautla Hacienda located in the rich valley of Puebla and on his return to Mexico devoted more of his attention to his family estate than to ecclesiastical matters. As the son of an agricultural entrepreneur who had a great interest in improving agriculture in Mexico, Gillow followed in his father's footsteps, involving himself in the Mexican Agricultural Society. At this hacienda, he built modern infrastructure, including the first hydroelectric plant in Latin America, as well as telegraph and telephone lines, imported the latest agricultural machinery, and gained railroad concessions. He built an English-style residence (locally known as "El Castillo" (The Castle)) for a planned agricultural school.

As a promoter of modern agriculture, he participated in expositions, which is how he came to the attention of Porfirio Díaz, a liberal former general who as president promoted modernization in Mexico, including foreign investment. Gillow organized an exposition in Puebla, where his estate was located, and there was hope of attracting investors from the U.S. Díaz himself opened the exposition, with multilingual Gillow as his interpreter and intermediary with businessmen. The relationship between Gillow and Díaz was the key to easing the Church-State conflict in Mexico. When the widowed Díaz married his second wife, seventeen-year-old Carmen Romero Rubio, the daughter of one of his key advisers, he asked Gillow preside, but Gillow suggested that the archbishop of Mexico and prominent supporter of the Second Mexican Empire to do the honors. Symbolically it was powerful, demonstrating the liberal Díaz's respect for the Church and the easing of the position of a prominent conservative cleric.

He was named archbishop of Oaxaca in 1891, which Díaz was pleased with. Gillow and Díaz exchanged expensive and symbolic gifts, a pastoral ring with a large emerald to Gillow, a jeweled representation of Napoleon's victories to Díaz. Gillow's post as archbishop in Díaz's home state had a number of benefits, due to his political and ecclesiastic connections. As such he worked to get a railway connection between Mexico City and Oaxaca and worked to open schools and preserve a number of the city's colonial churches.

During the Mexican Revolution, his estate in Puebla was seized by Constitutionalist forces. Gillow went into exile in Los Angeles, but returned to Mexico just prior to his death in 1922. He was archbishop until his death in 1922. According to one scholar, Gillow was the model for D.H. Lawrence's character of Bishop Severn in The Plumed Serpent (1926).

== Writings ==
- Apuntes históricos sobre la idolatría y la introducción del cristianismo en la diócesis de Oaxaca.
- Reminiscencias del Ilmo. y Rmo. Sr. Dr. D. Eulogio Gillow y Zavalza, Arzobispo de Antequera (Oaxaca). Four editions published between 1920 and 1921.
- Actas y Decretos del Concilio I de Antequera celebrado en Oaxaca, del día 8 de diciembre de 1892 al día 12 de marzo de 1893.
- Primera carta pastoral del Illmo. señor doctor don Eulogio G. Gillow en la que saluda al clero y fieles de la diócesis que se le ha confiado
- Informe rendido á la Sociedad agrícola mexicana, sobre las ventajas que resultan á México de cultivar los cereales con la maquinaria agrícola norte-Americana, 1880.

== See also ==
- Richard Gillow
- Robert Gillow
- Joseph Gillow
- Gillows of Lancaster and London
