= Diocese of Puerto Escondido =

Latin Catholic jurisdiction in Mexico

Diocese of Puerto Escondido Dioecesis Portus Abditi

Location
- Country: Mexico
- Ecclesiastical province: Antequera
- Population: 423,000

Information
- Denomination: Catholic Church
- Sui iuris church: Latin Church
- Rite: Roman Rite
- Established: November 8, 2003

Current leadership
- Pope: Leo XIV
- Bishop: Florencio Armando Colín Cruz; Bishop of Puerto Escondido

Map
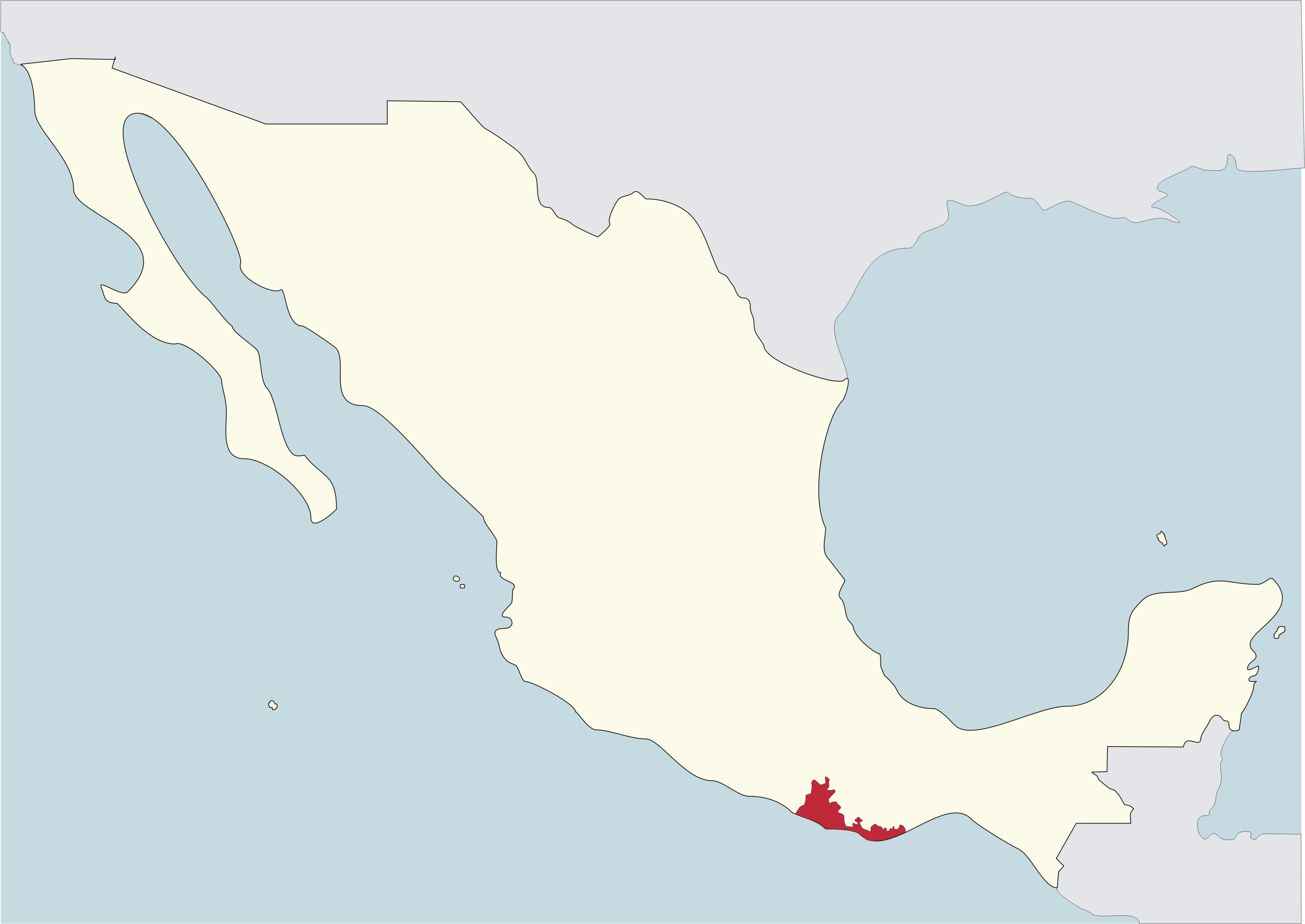

The Diocese of Puerto Escondido (Latin: Dioecesis Portus Abditi) is a Latin Church ecclesiastical territory or diocese of the Catholic Church in Mexico. It is a suffragan in the ecclesiastical province of the metropolitan Archdiocese of Antequera.

The diocese's episcopal see is Puerto Escondido.

== Ordinaries ==
- Eduardo Cirilo Carmona Ortega, O.R.C. (November 8, 2003 – June 27, 2012), appointed Bishop of Parral, Chihuahua
- Pedro Vázquez Villalobos (October 31, 2012 – February 10, 2018), appointed Archbishop of Antequera, Oaxaca
- Florencio Armando Colín Cruz (February 16, 2019 – September 29, 2026)
- Héctor López Alvarado (September 29, 2026 – present)

== External links and references ==
- "Diocese of Puerto Escondido". Catholic-Hierarchy.
