= Francisco Diego Díaz de Quintanilla y de Hevía y Valdés =

Spanish Roman Catholic bishop

Most Reverend Francisco Diego Díaz de Quintanilla y de Hevía y Valdés
- Bishop of Antequera, Oaxaca
- Church: Catholic Church
- Diocese: Diocese of Antequera
- In office: 1655–1656
- Predecessor: Bartolomé de Benavente y Benavides
- Successor: Juan Alonso de Cuevas y Davalos
- Previous post: Bishop of Durango (1639–1655)

Orders
- Consecration: 8 January 1640 by Mauro Diego de Tovar y Valle Maldonado

Personal details
- Born: 4 October 1587 Oviedo, Spain
- Died: 6 December 1656 (aged 69) Antequera, Oaxaca, Mexico

Francisco Diego Díaz de Quintanilla y de Hevía y Valdés, O.S.B. (4 October 1587 – 6 December 1656) was a Roman Catholic prelate who served as Bishop of Antequera, Oaxaca (1655–1656) and Bishop of Durango (1639–1655).

== Biography ==
Francisco Diego Díaz de Quintanilla y de Hevía y Valdés was born in Oviedo, Spain on 4 October 1587 and ordained a priest in the Order of Saint Benedict. On 8 August 1639, he was appointed during the papacy of Pope Urban VIII as Bishop of Durango. On 8 January 1640, he was consecrated bishop by Juan de Palafox y Mendoza, Bishop of Tlaxcala, with Cristóbal Pérez Lazarraga y Maneli Viana, Bishop of Chiapas, and Mauro Diego de Tovar y Valle Maldonado, Bishop of Caracas, serving as co-consecrators. On 14 May 1655, he was appointed during the papacy of Pope Alexander VII as Bishop of Antequera, Oaxaca. He served as Bishop of Antequera, Oaxaca until his death on 6 December 1656.

While bishop, he was the principal consecrator of Pedro de Barrientos Lomelin, Bishop of Durango (1656); and Juan de Montiel, Bishop of Santiago de Cuba (1656).

== External links and additional sources ==
- Cheney, David M. "Archdiocese of Durango". Catholic-Hierarchy.org. (for Chronology of Bishops) ^{[self-published]}
- Chow, Gabriel. "Archdiocese of Durango (Mexico)". GCatholic.org. (for Chronology of Bishops) ^{[self-published]}
- Cheney, David M. "Archdiocese of Antequera, Oaxaca". Catholic-Hierarchy.org. (for Chronology of Bishops) ^{[self-published]}
- Chow, Gabriel. "Metropolitan Archdiocese of Antequera". GCatholic.org. (for Chronology of Bishops) ^{[self-published]}

Catholic Church titles
Preceded by Alfonso de Franco y Luna	Bishop of Durango; 1639–1655	Succeeded by Pedro de Barrientos Lomelin
Preceded by Bartolomé de Benavente y Benavides	Bishop of Antequera, Oaxaca; 1655–1656	Succeeded by Juan Alonso de Cuevas y Davalos
