= San Salvador el Verde =

Coordinates: 19°16′N 98°31′W

- Municipality and town
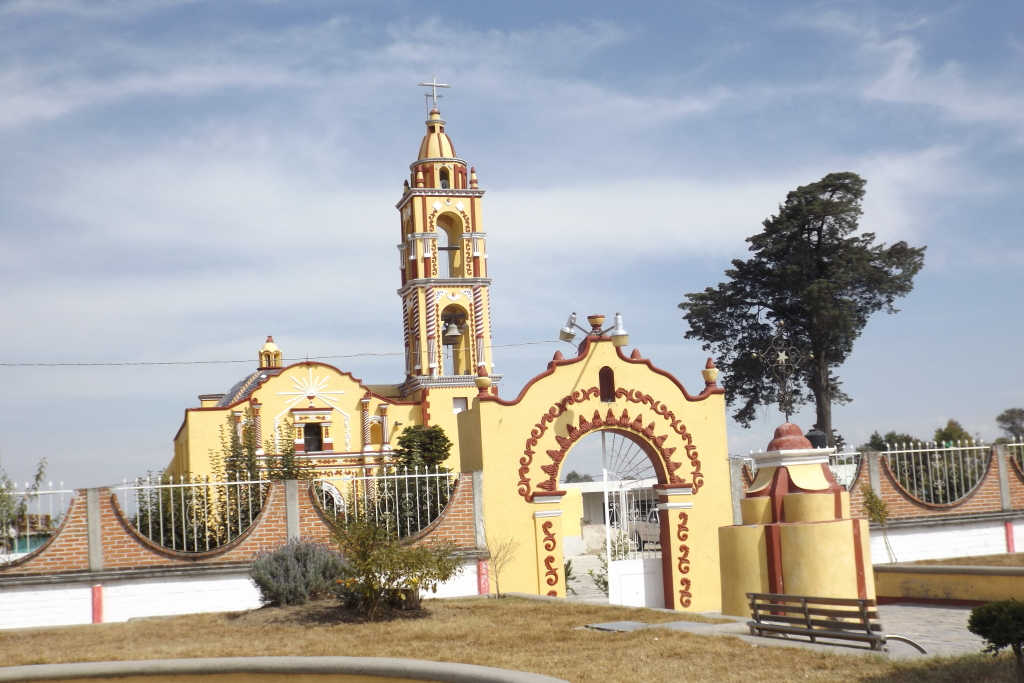
- Interactive map of San Salvador el Verde
- Country: Mexico
- State: Puebla
- Time zone: UTC-6 (Zona Centro)

San Salvador el Verde is a town and municipality in the Mexican state of Puebla. It is best known as the site of the Chautla Hacienda, which was the property of Eulogio Gillow, the first archbishop of Antequera (city of Oaxaca) and contains an English style residence called locally called "El Castillo" (The Castle). The facility today is run as a recreation center.
