= José María Covarrubias y Mejía =

Mexican priest (1826–1867)

José María Covarrubias y Mejía (born 1826 in Querétaro City) was a Mexican clergyman and bishop for the Roman Catholic Archdiocese of Antequera, Oaxaca. He was ordained in 1839. He was appointed bishop in 1861. He died in 1867.
