= Diocese of Tehuantepec =

Latin Catholic jurisdiction in Mexico

Diocese of Tehuantepec Dioecesis Tehuantepecensis
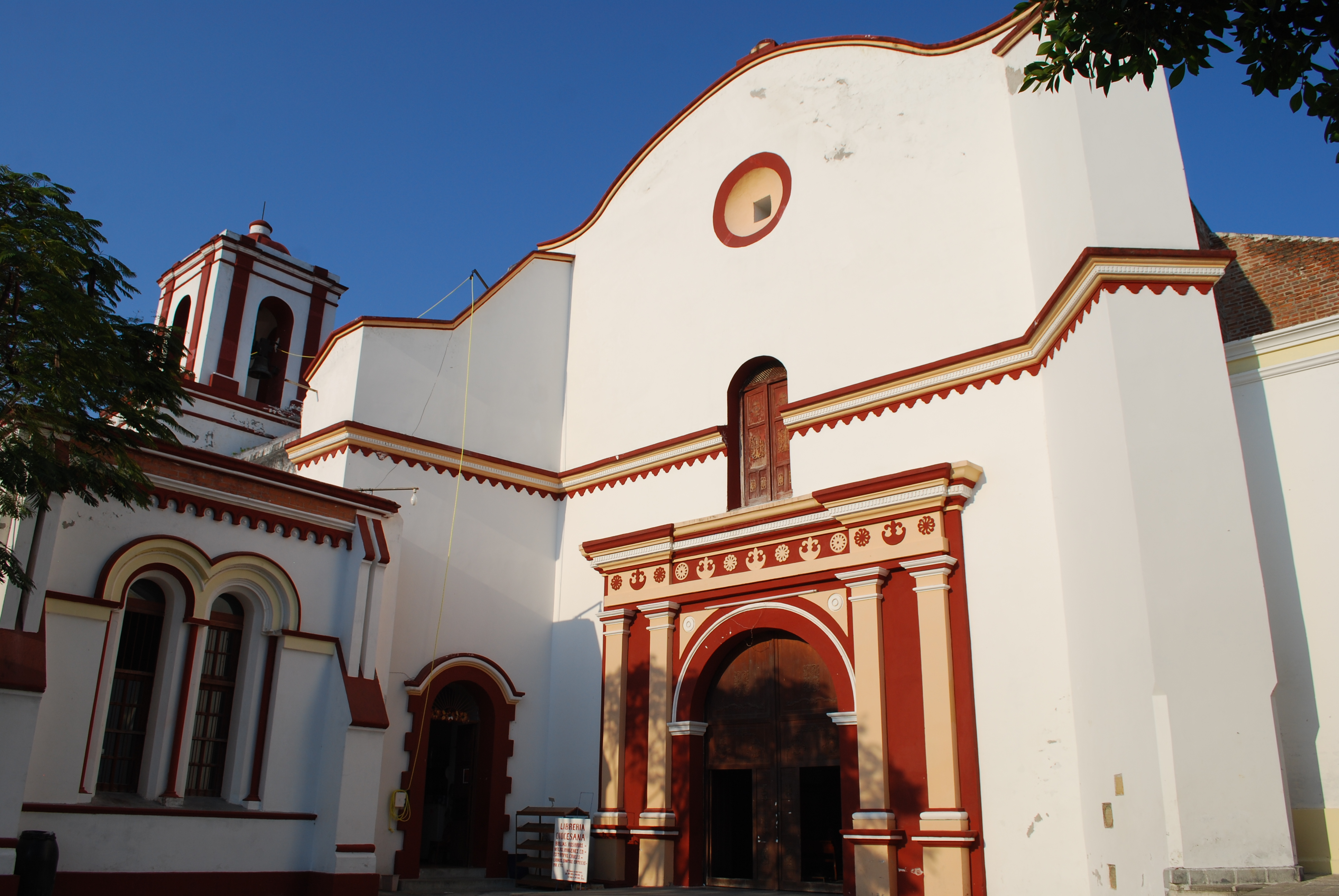

Location
- Country: Mexico
- Ecclesiastical province: Antequera
- Population: 1,320,000

Information
- Denomination: Catholic Church
- Sui iuris church: Latin Church
- Rite: Roman Rite
- Established: June 23, 1891

Current leadership
- Pope: Leo XIV
- Bishop: Crispín Ojeda Márquez; Bishop of Tehuantepec

The Diocese of Tehuantepec (Latin: Dioecesis Tehuantepecensis) is a Latin Church ecclesiastical territory or diocese of the Catholic Church in Mexico. It is a suffragan in the ecclesiastical province of the metropolitan Archdiocese of Antequera. It was erected in 1891 from the Dioceses of Veracruz and Antequera.

== Bishops ==
=== Ordinaries ===
- José Mora y del Rio (1893–1901), appointed, Bishop of Tulancingo, Hidalgo
- Carlos de Jesús Mejía y Laguna, C.M. (1902–1907)
- Ignacio Placencia y Moreira (1907–1922), appointed Archbishop (Personal Title) of Zacatecas
- Jenaro Méndez y del Río (1923–1933), appointed, Bishop of Huajuapan de León, Oaxaca
- Jesús Villareal y Fierro (1933–1959), appointed Bishop of San Andrés Tuxtla, Veracruz
- José de Jesús Clemens Alba Palacios (1959–1970), appointed Auxiliary Bishop of Antequera, Oaxaca
- Arturo Lona Reyes (1971–2000)
- Felipe Padilla Cardona (2000–2009), appointed Bishop of Ciudad Obregón, Sonora
- Óscar Armando Campos Contreras (2010–2017), appointed, Bishop of Ciudad Guzmán, Jalisco
- Crispin Ojeda Márquez (2018–present)

=== Coadjutor bishop ===
- Felipe Padilla Cardona (1996–2000)

=== Auxiliary bishop ===
- José Refugio Mercado Díaz (2003–2009)
