= José Gregorio Alonso de Ortigosa =

José Gregorio Alonso de Ortigosa (born 1720 in Viguera) was a Spanish clergyman and bishop for the Roman Catholic Archdiocese of Antequera, Oaxaca. He was ordained in 1775. He was appointed bishop in 1775. He died in 1797.
