= Juan López de Zárate =

Spanish Roman Catholic prelate (1490 – 1555)

Most Reverend Juan López de Zárate
- Bishop of Antequera, Oaxaca
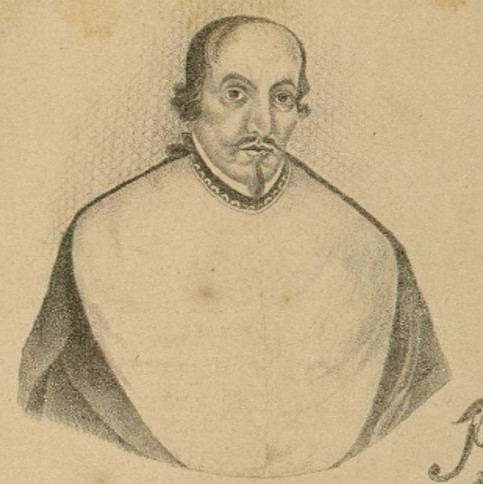
- Church: Catholic Church
- Diocese: Diocese of Antequera, Oaxaca
- In office: 1535–1555
- Predecessor: None
- Successor: Bernardo de Albuquerque

Orders
- Consecration: April 8, 1537 by Juan de Zumárraga

Personal details
- Born: June 24, 1490 Oviedo, Spain
- Died: September 10, 1555 (age 65)

Juan López de Zárate (June 24, 1490 – September 10, 1555) was a Spanish Roman Catholic prelate who served as the first Bishop of Antequera, Oaxaca (1535–1555).

== Biography ==
Juan López de Zárate was born in Oviedo, Spain. On June 21, 1535, he was appointed by Pope Paul III as Bishop of Antequera, Oaxaca. On April 8, 1537, he was consecrated bishop by Don Juan de Zumárraga, Archbishop of Mexico.

While bishop, he was the principal consecrator of Martín Sarmiento de Osacastro, Bishop of Tlaxcala (1549) and the principal co-consecrator of Francisco Marroquín Hurtado, Bishop of Santiago de Guatemala (1537)

Zárate died on September 10, 1555, while in attendance at the First Mexican Provincial Council.

== External links and additional sources ==
- Cheney, David M. "Archdiocese of Antequera, Oaxaca". Catholic-Hierarchy.org. (for Chronology of Bishops) ^{[self-published]}
- Chow, Gabriel. "Metropolitan Archdiocese of Antequera". GCatholic.org. (for Chronology of Bishops) ^{[self-published]}

Catholic Church titles
| Preceded by None | Diocese of Antequera, Oaxaca; 1535–1555 | Succeeded by Bernardo de Albuquerque |
