= José Refugio Mercado Díaz =

José Refugio Mercado Díaz (June 28, 1942 – October 15, 2014) was a Roman Catholic bishop.

Ordained to the priesthood on April 2, 1972, Mercado Díaz was appointed auxiliary bishop of the Roman Catholic Diocese of Tehuantepec, Mexico and titular bishop of Turuzi on September 16, 2003, and was ordained on November 15, 2014. He resigned on June 10, 2009.
