= Diego Felipe Gómez de Angulo =

Roman-catholic bishop

Diego Felipe Gómez de Angulo (born 1676 in Burgos) was a Spanish clergyman and bishop for the Roman Catholic Archdiocese of Antequera, Oaxaca. He was ordained in 1744. He was appointed bishop in 1745. He died in 1752.
