= Ángel Mariano de Morales y Jasso =

Mexican clergyman

Ángel Mariano de Morales y Jasso (born 1784 in Tangancícuaro) was a Mexican clergyman and bishop for the Roman Catholic Archdiocese of Antequera, Oaxaca, and earlier for Sonora. He was ordained in 1832. He was appointed bishop in 1841. He died in 1843.
