= José Epigmenio Villanueva y Gomez de Eguiarreta =

José Epigmenio Villanueva y Gomez de Eguiarreta (born 1792 in Taxco) was a Mexican clergyman and bishop for the Roman Catholic Archdiocese of Antequera, Oaxaca. He was ordained in 1815. He was appointed bishop in 1839. He died in 1840.
