= Bernardo de Albuquerque =

Spanish-Mexican prelate

Most Reverend Bernardo de Albuquerque
- Bishop of Antequera, Oaxaca
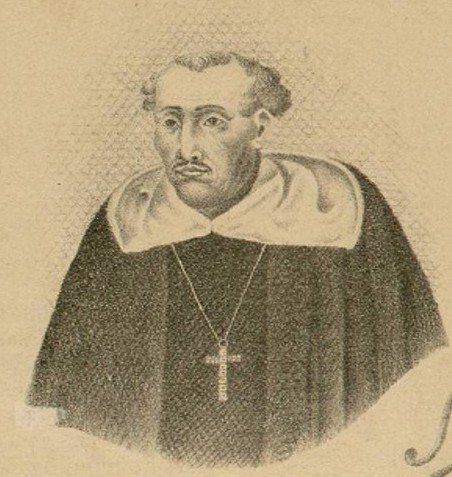
- Church: Catholic Church
- Diocese: Diocese of Antequera, Oaxaca
- In office: 1561–1579
- Predecessor: Juan López de Zárate
- Successor: Bartolomé de Ledesma

Orders
- Consecration: 8 November 1562 by Alonso de Montúfar

Personal details
- Born: Alburquerque, Spain
- Died: 23 July 1579 Antequera, Oaxaca, Mexico

Bernardo de Albuquerque, O.P. (died 23 July 1579) was a Roman Catholic prelate who served as Bishop of Antequera, Oaxaca (1561–1579).

== Biography ==
Bernardo de Albuquerque was ordained a priest in the Order of Preachers. On 27 June 1561, he was selected by the King of Spain and confirmed by Pope Pius IV as Bishop of Antequera, Oaxaca. On 8 November 1562, he was consecrated bishop by Alonso de Montúfar, Archbishop of México with Vasco de Quiroga, Bishop of Michoacán, and Fernando de Villagómez, Bishop of Tlaxcala, as co-consecrators. He served as Bishop of Antequera, Oaxaca until his death on 23 July 1579. In the year 1561, Bernardo de Albuquerque saw fit to destroy Mitla and exile most of its inhabitants, specifically the indigenous religious practitioners.

== External links and additional sources ==
- Cheney, David M. "Archdiocese of Antequera, Oaxaca". Catholic-Hierarchy.org. (for Chronology of Bishops) ^{[self-published]}
- Chow, Gabriel. "Metropolitan Archdiocese of Antequera". GCatholic.org. (for Chronology of Bishops) ^{[self-published]}
- Bitto, Robert (29 August 2021). "Mitla: Magnificent City of Rest". MexicoUnexplained. ^{[self-published]}

Catholic Church titles
Preceded by Juan López de Zárate	Bishop of Antequera, Oaxaca; 1561–1579	Succeeded by Bartolomé de Ledesma
