= Tomás Montaño y Aarón =

Roman-catholic bishop

Tomás Montaño y Aarón (born 1683 in Mexico City) was a Mexican clergyman and bishop for the Roman Catholic Archdiocese of Antequera, Oaxaca. He was ordained in 1737. He was appointed bishop in 1738. He died in 1742.
