= José Gaudencio León Castañeda =

Mexican politician

- Born: 22 January 1960 (age 66); Puebla, Mexico
- Occupation: Politician
- Political party: PAN

José Gaudencio Víctor León Castañeda (born 22 January 1960) is a Mexican politician from the National Action Party (PAN). In the 2000 general election he was elected to the Chamber of Deputies to represent Puebla's 5th district during the 58th session of Congress.
