= Manuel Plácido de Quirós de Porras =

Manuel Plácido de Quirós de Porras (born 1652 in Tineo) was a Spanish clergyman and bishop for the Roman Catholic Archdiocese of Antequera, Oaxaca. He was ordained in 1698. He was appointed bishop in 1698. He died in 1699.
