= Juan Aguirre y Gorozpe =

Most Reverend Juan Aguirre y Gorozpe
- Bishop of Durango
- Church: Catholic Church
- Diocese: Diocese of Durango
- In office: 1659–1671
- Predecessor: Pedro de Barrientos Lomelin
- Successor: Juan de Ortega Cano Montañez y Patiño

Orders
- Consecration: 19 December 1660 by Mateo de Sagade de Bugueyro

Personal details
- Born: 1599 Tecamachalco, Mexico
- Died: 21 September 1671 (age 72) Durango, Mexico

Juan Aguirre y Gorozpe (1599 – 21 September 1671) was a Roman Catholic prelate who served as Bishop of Durango (1659–1671).

== Biography ==
Juan Aguirre y Gorozpe was born in Tecamachalco, Mexico in 1599. On 17 November 1659, he was appointed during the papacy of Pope Alexander VII as Bishop of Durango. On 19 December 1660, he was consecrated bishop by Mateo de Sagade de Bugueyro, Archbishop of Mexico. He served as Bishop of Durango until his death on 21 September 1671.

== See also ==
- Catholic Church in Mexico

== External links and additional sources ==
- Cheney, David M. "Archdiocese of Durango". Catholic-Hierarchy.org. (for Chronology of Bishops) ^{[self-published]}
- Chow, Gabriel. "Archdiocese of Durango (Mexico)". GCatholic.org. (for Chronology of Bishops) ^{[self-published]}

Catholic Church titles
Preceded by Pedro de Barrientos Lomelin	Bishop of Durango; 1659–1671	Succeeded by Juan de Ortega Cano Montañez y Patiño
