= Francisco de Santiago y Calderón =

Spanish Roman Catholic bishop (1669–1736)

Francisco de Santiago y Calderón (5 February 1669 – 13 October 1736) was a Spanish clergyman and bishop for the Roman Catholic Archdiocese of Antequera, Oaxaca. He was appointed bishop 6 July 1729, and ordained bishop on 19 June 1730. He died on 13 October 1736.

== Early life, education, and career ==
De Santiago was born in Torralba de Calatrava, in the diocese of Cuenca. He joined the Order of La Merced. He was a lecturer in arts at a convent school in Huete, and later taught sacred theology at the University of Salamanca and at that of Alcalá. He then became rector of the ancient University of Madrid. He was recommended to be Bishop of Guatemala in 1728. As an established Spanish academic administrator and theologian, he was a safe choice for the Church in New Spain. He was appointed bishop 6 July 1729, and ordained bishop on 19 June 1730.

== Work as bishop ==
De Santiago was elected bishop and had a parade in his honor upon his arrival to Oaxaca on 21 December 1729.

He was ordained as bishop on 19 June 1730. His Principal Consecrator was Bishop José Félix Valverde, Bishop of Caracas, Santiago de Venezuela, and was assisted by two priests, Father Paul de Velasco Campos and Manuel Hidalgo. (Normally, co-consecrators are bishops, but in 18th colonial dioceses, getting three bishops together in one place was difficult, so it was common that priests, especially Monsignors, would be deputized in exigencies.)

His first act as bishop was to consecrate the new Cathedral.

Continuing the campaigns of the Counter-Reformation, and in particular those of his predecessor Bishop Maldonado, de Santiago fought against non-Christian practices termed "idolatry", accepted the Dominican concept of the 15 mysteries, and increased the number of Spanish language teachers in his diocese between 1730 and 1734, although he was only partially successful in stamping out Zapotec syncretic practices like ancestor worship.

Bishop de Santiago created rules in 1731 for confradías to organize and pay for festivals, which were later copied by other dioceses in Mexico.

In July 1735, de Santiago, in his ecclesiastical role as judge of a canon law court, indicted several local government officials for "alleged cannibalism and child sacrifice," and eventually imprisoned them for idolatry.

He completed building the Cathedral, including two towers and a clock, and was famous for giving alms. In 1735, De Santiago also consecrated the temple and convent of Saint Francis of Assisi in Oaxaca.

He died on 13 October 1736.
