= José Agustín Domínguez y Díaz =

Roman-catholic bishop

José Agustín Domínguez y Díaz (born 1790 in Villa de Zaachila – died 1859) was a Mexican clergyman and bishop for the Roman Catholic Archdiocese of Antequera, Oaxaca. He was ordained in 1814. He was appointed bishop in 1854. He died in 1859.
