= José Antonio Domínguez =

Panamanian politician

- Born: 1960 (age 65–66); Panama City, Panama
- Education: Colegio Javier; Santa Maria La Antigua University
- Occupations: Minister of Public Works (1993–1994) Ambassador and Consul to Taiwan (1999–2004) Deputy of the National Assembly (2014–2019)
- Political party: Panameñista Party

José Antonio Domínguez Álvarez (born 1960) is a Panamanian politician who served as minister of public works and as a deputy in the National Assembly. He is the son of the late businessman and politician Antonio "Tony" Domínguez.

== Politics ==
José Antonio Domínguez started his career as a civil engineer who later went on to work as an advisor to the minister of public works. He later became minister of public works from 1993 until 1994. In 1999, Mireya Moscoso appointed him to the post of ambassador and consul to Taiwan. In 2013, Domínguez ran for president of the Panameñista Party but lost against the former vice president and president of the Republic of Panama, Juan Carlos Varela. In 2014, Dominguez ran for deputy for district 8-6. He was elected to the position and served in the post until 2019 when he lost reelection. During his tenure as deputy, he had strong opposition to what his party was doing due to mismanagement and corruption in the government.
