= Santiago Tilapa =

- Town
- Location within State of Mexico
- Coordinates: 19°13′9″N 99°25′7″W
- Country: Mexico
- State: State of Mexico
- Municipality: Tianguistenco
- Founded: 1570
- Reconocimiento como pueblo de la corona: 13 de Marzo de 1777
- Construcción Parroquia del Divino Salvador: 1590

Area
  - Total: 10.83 km^{2} (4.18 sq mi)
- Elevation (of seat): 2,774 m (9,101 ft)
- Time zone: UTC-6 (CST)
- Website: http://www.tianguistengo.gob.mx/

Santiago Tilapa is a town inside the municipality of Tianguistenco in Mexico. It was an indigenous settlement with people who speak Otomi.
