= Vicente Fermín Márquez y Carrizosa =

Vicente Fermín Márquez y Carrizosa (born 1811 in Santo Domingo Yanhuitlán) was a Mexican clergyman and bishop for the Roman Catholic Archdiocese of Antequera, Oaxaca. He was ordained in 1835. He was appointed bishop in 1868. He died in 1887.
