= Coalition of Workers, Peasants, and Students of the Isthmus =

Mexican socialist political organization

The Coalition of Workers, Peasants, and Students of the Isthmus (Spanish: Coalición Obrera, Campesina, Estudiantil del Istmo) (COCEI) is a Mexican socialist political organization in Juchitán, Oaxaca. Founded in 1973/1974, it supports agrarian reform, and workers rights. In 1981 it won municipal elections, after which it formed the first socialist city council in Mexico.

== Foundation ==
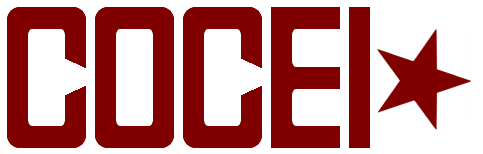
Coalición Obrera, Campesina, Estudiantil del Istmo (COCEI) Logo

The COCEI was initially composed of Indigenous Zapotec farmers and supported by portions of the local Juchitán society who were not in agreement with the government of the time. The COCEI was known for "organizing a discontented population" and linked to theories of democratic emergence and popular defense movements. Among the group's original goals, was securing changes to the electoral process in the Isthmus region, making them more transparent, seeking agrarian reform, and engaging in union movements for wage increases. The group's rapid expansion was noted as being due to its ability to diversify its goals and ideas and, through incorporating new sectors. In 1976, the COCEI won the election for the Communal Lands Commission.

== Municipal elections ==
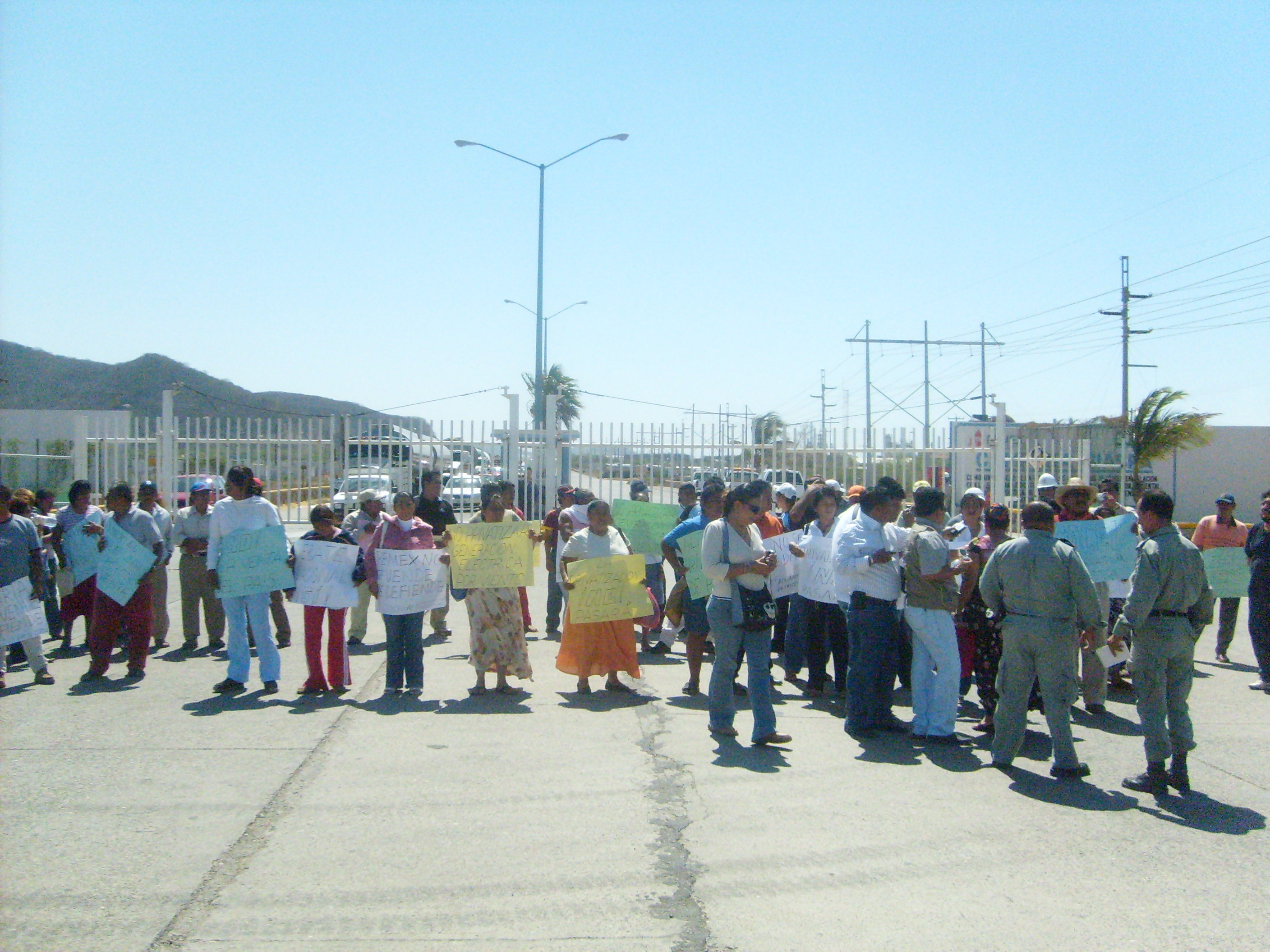
COCEI Protest

In 1981, the COCEI won the municipal election in a coalition with the Unified Socialist Party of Mexico (PSUM) and founded the Popular City Council with the goal of "rescuing Zapotec culture" and achieving urban development with autonomy. The Popular City Council, and the COCEI electoral win, constituted the first socialist city council in Mexico; COCEI member Leopoldo de Gyves became mayor of Juchitán. The COCEI made the Zapotec people the focus of the election, advertising in their language and promoting Indigenous culture. The ruling Institutional Revolutionary Party (Spanish: Partido Revolucionario Institucional) (PRI) feared that the COCEI demands would create a "state within a state" through their actions. The Oaxaca state government began subordinating the Popular City Council, expropriating the functions of the city council to higher chambers of government. Rumors began to leak of the Popular City Council being linked to Guatemalan and Nicaraguan guerrilla fighters, a smear campaign began on TV, radio and news outlets, aldermen were murdered and the army took up presence at the local city offices and municipal palace.

The Popular City Council however continued on with their social programs, starting literacy campaigns in shanty towns, coordinating with the Independent University of Guerrero to found the preparatory school and the Popular Teacher Training College of the Isthmus, and to begin the Popular City Council Radio, which aired without the permission of the government. Municipal officials repaired streets, built and refurbished local health centers, created a public library and rebuilt city hall. On August 3, 1983, the ruling PRI government called an extraordinary session of the federal Chamber of Deputies, removing all municipal powers, officially removing recognition of the COCEI.

In response on August 6, a referendum was called by approximately 30,000 people from Juchitán. The result of the referendum was to continue to maintain the Popular City Council through self funding, despite the government's attempts to dissolve the COCEI's control. On December 13, federal police officers and army soldiers evacuated the municipal palace, arresting 250 people. In response, thousands of people rallied at the city center, met by army units from Oaxaca and neighboring Veracruz, 150 additional prisoners were taken, effectively dissolving the COCEI government.

With incoming President Carlos Salinas de Gortari (1988-1994) came a shift in dealing with opposition groups. In 1989, the convertación social project was launched. The project offered economic and political support for opposition groups in exchange for a cessation of militancy, and a public acknowledgment of coexistence with the Salinas government. The COCEI accepted and from 1986 to 1989, the COCEI participated in a coalition city government alongside the ruling PRI party. In 1989 the COCEI again won the Juchitán municipal elections, ruling until 1992.

In 2007 the COCEI again won the municipal election, this time in a coalition with the Labor Party.
