= Antonio Domínguez Álvarez =

Antonio Dominguez Alvarez
- Education: Notre Dame BE; J.L. Kellogg Graduate School Management MBA

Antonio Dominguez Alvarez is a Panamanian businessman and former member of the board of directors of the Panama Canal. He is now the Inspector General of the Panama Canal.

== Business ==
Dominguez Alvarez worked at various private sector companies for 30 years before becoming the Inspector General of the Panama Canal. This included a role as director of Frito-Lay for Central America. He also formed part of the Industrial Syndicate as an active member for many years.

== Panama Canal ==
In 2001, Mireya Moscoso assigned him to the role as one of the members of the board of directors of the Panama Canal so he could focus in the areas of finances and accounting. He served in this post until 2010. In 2012, he was appointed as the Inspector General of the Panama Canal. He is currently serving in this role.
