= Janet González Tostado =

Mexican politician

- Born: 20 December 1957 (age 68); Puebla, Puebla, Mexico
- Occupation: Politician
- Political party: PRI

Janet Graciela González Tostado (Note: In this Spanish name, the first or paternal surname is González and the second or maternal family name is Tostado.) (born 20 December 1957) is a Mexican politician from the Institutional Revolutionary Party (PRI). In the 2009 mid-terms she was elected to the Chamber of Deputies to represent Puebla's 5th district during the 61st session of Congress.
