= Tlaltenango, Puebla =

Tlaltenango
- Municipality and town
- Location within Puebla (state) Location within Mexico
- Coordinates: 19°10′22″N 98°20′40″W
- Country: Mexico
- State: Puebla
- Time zone: UTC-6 (Zona Centro)
- Website: tlaltenango.puebla.gob.mx

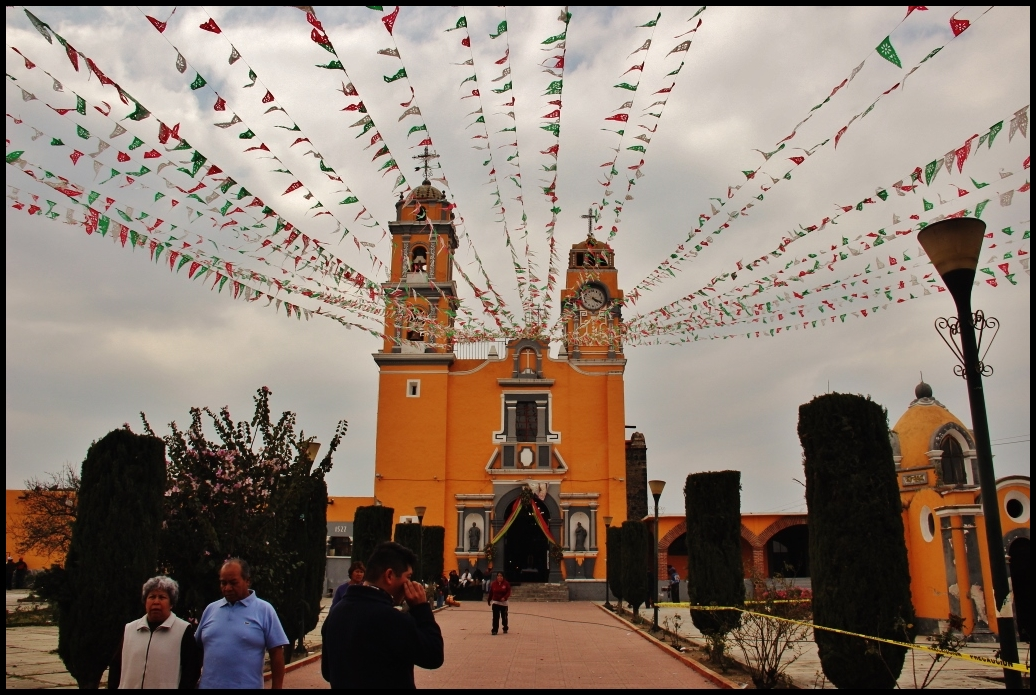

Tlaltenango is a town and its surrounding municipality in the Mexican state of Puebla.
