= Archdiocese of Antequera, Oaxaca =

Latin Catholic jurisdiction in Mexico

Coordinates: 17.0616°N 96.7253°W

Archdiocese of Antequera, Oaxaca Archidioecesis Antequerensis
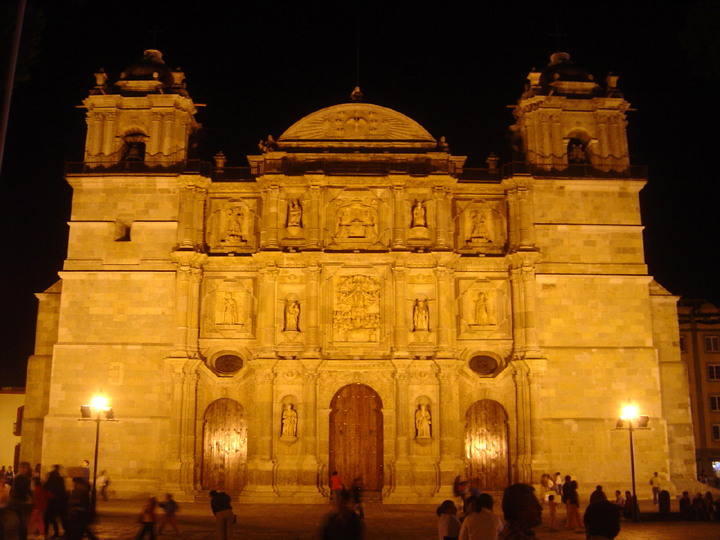
- Nuestra Señora de la Asunción Cathedral at night

Location
- Country: Mexico
- Ecclesiastical province: Antequera
- Population: 1,132,000

Information
- Denomination: Catholic Church
- Sui iuris church: Latin Church
- Rite: Roman Rite
- Established: June 21, 1535
- Cathedral: Catedral Metropolitana de Nuestra Señora de la Asunción
- Patron saint: Our Lady of the Assumption

Current leadership
- Pope: Leo XIV
- Archbishop: Pedro Vázquez Villalobos
- Bishops emeritus: José Luis Chávez Botello; Archbishop emeritus of Antequera, Oaxaca

Map

Website
- arzobispadodeoaxaca.org

The Archdiocese of Antequera, Oaxaca (Latin: Archidioecesis Antequerensis) is a Latin Church ecclesiastical territory or archdiocese of the Catholic Church in Mexico. The cathedral church is the Cathedral of Our Lady of the Assumption in the episcopal see of Oaxaca. It was erected on June 21, 1535.

The archdiocese covers part of the state of Oaxaca. A metropolitan see, its episcopal conference includes the suffragan dioceses of Puerto Escondido, Tehuantepec, Tuxtepec and the territorial prelatures of Huautla and Mixes. It is currently led by Archbishop Pedro Vázquez Villalobos.

As of 2004, the archdiocese contained 113 parishes, 126 active diocesan priests, 39 religious priests, and 940,000 Catholics. It also had 268 women religious, 59 religious brothers, and 21 permanent deacons.

== Diocesan bishops ==
The following is a list of the bishops and archbishops and their tenure of service:

=== Diocese of Antequera, Oaxaca ===
- Juan Lopez de Zárate (1535–1555) Died
- Bernardo de Albuquerque (1561–1579) Died
- Bartolomé de Ledesma (1583–1604) Died
- Baltazar de Cobarrubias y Múñoz (1605–1608) Appointed, Bishop of Michoacán
- Juan de Cervantes (1608–1614) Died
- Juan Bartolomé de Bohorquez e Hinojosa (1617–1633) Died
- Leonel de Cervantes y Caravajal (1636–1637) Died
- Bartolomé de Benavente y Benavides (1639–1652) Died
- Francisco Diego Díaz de Quintanilla y de Hevía y Valdés (1653–1656) Died
- Juan Alonso de Cuevas y Davalos (1658–1664) Appointed, Archbishop of México
- Tomás de Monterroso (1664–1678) Died)
- Nicolás Ortiz del Puerto y Colmenares Salgado (1679–1681) Died
- Isidoro Sariñara y Medina Cuenca (1683–1696) Died
- Manuel Plácido de Quirós de Porras (1698–1699) Died
- Ángel de Maldonado, O. Cist. (1700–1728) Died
- Francisco de Santiago y Calderón (1729–1736) Died
- Tomás Montaño y Aarón (1737–1742) Died
- Diego Felipe Gómez de Angulo (1744–1752) Died
- Buenaventura Blanco y Elguero (Helguero) (1753–1764) Died
- Miguel Anselmo Álvarez de Abreu y Valdéz (1765–1774) Died
- José Gregorio Alonso de Ortigosa (1775–1793) Resigned
- Gregorio Jose de Omaña y Sotomayor (1792–1797) Died
- Antonio Bergosa y Jordán (1801–1817) Confirmed, Archbishop of Tarragona, Spain
- Manuel Isidoro Perez Sánchez (1819–1837) Resigned
- José Epigmenio Villanueva y Gomez de Eguiarreta (1839–1840) Died
- Angel Mariano de Morales y Jasso (1841–1843) Died
- Antonio Mantecón e Ibañez (1844–1852) Died
- José Agustín Domínguez y Diaz (1854–1859) Died
- José María Covarrubias y Mejía (1861–1867) Died
- Vicente Fermín Márquez y Carrizosa (1868–1887) Died
- Eulogio Gregorio Clemente Gillow y Zavalza (1887–1891) see below

=== Archdiocese of Antequera, Oaxaca ===
elevated June 23, 1891

- Eulogio Gregorio Clemente Gillow y Zavalza (1891–1922) Died see above
- José Othón Núñez y Zárate (1922–1941) Died
- Fortino Gómez León (1942–1967) Retired
- Ernesto Corripio y Ahumada (1967–1976) Appointed, Archbishop of Puebla de los Ángeles
- Bartolomé Carrasco Briseño (1976–1993) Retired
- Héctor González Martínez (1993–2003) Appointed, Archbishop of Durango
- José Luis Chávez Botello (2003–2018)
- Pedro Vázquez Villalobos (2018–present)

=== Coadjutor bishops ===
- José Othón Núñez y Zárate (1922)
- Héctor González Martínez (1988–1993)

=== Auxiliary bishops ===
- Francisco Ramón Valentín de Casaus y Torres, O.P. (1807–1815), appointed Archbishop of Guatemala
- José María Irigoyen y Munoz Cano (1842–1843)
- Francisco Garcia Cantarines (1845–1847)
- José de Jesús Clemens Alba Palacios (1954–1959), appointed Bishop of Tehuantepec, Oaxaca; but was auxiliary here again, 1970–1984
- Bartolomé Carrasco Briseño (1967–1971), appointed Bishop of Tapachula, Chiapas; but returned here as Archbishop, 1976
- Miguel Ángel Alba Díaz (1995–2001), appointed Bishop of La Paz en la Baja California Sur
- Óscar Armando Campos Contreras (2006–2010), appointed Bishop of Tehuantepec, Oaxaca
- Gonzalo Alonso Calzada Guerrero (2012–2018), was Celaya Diocese seminary rector when appointed here; appointed Bishop of Tehuacán, Puebla

== See also ==
- List of Roman Catholic archdioceses in México

== External links and additional sources ==
- Cheney, David M. "Archdiocese of Antequera, Oaxaca". Catholic-Hierarchy.org. (for Chronology of Bishops)^{self-published}
- Chow, Gabriel. "Metropolitan Archdiocese of Antequera". GCatholic.org. (for Chronology of Bishops)^{self-published}
