= San Martín Texmelucan (municipality) =

- Municipality
- Interactive map of San Martín Texmelucan
- Coordinates: 19°17′N 98°26′W
- Country: Mexico
- State: Puebla
- Municipal seat: San Martín Texmelucan

Government
  - Presidenta municipal: Norma Layón
- Time zone: UTC-6 (Zona Centro)

San Martín Texmelucan is a town and municipality in the Mexican state of Puebla.
