= San Martín Texmelucan =

City in Puebla, Mexico

Coordinates: 19°17′N 98°26′W

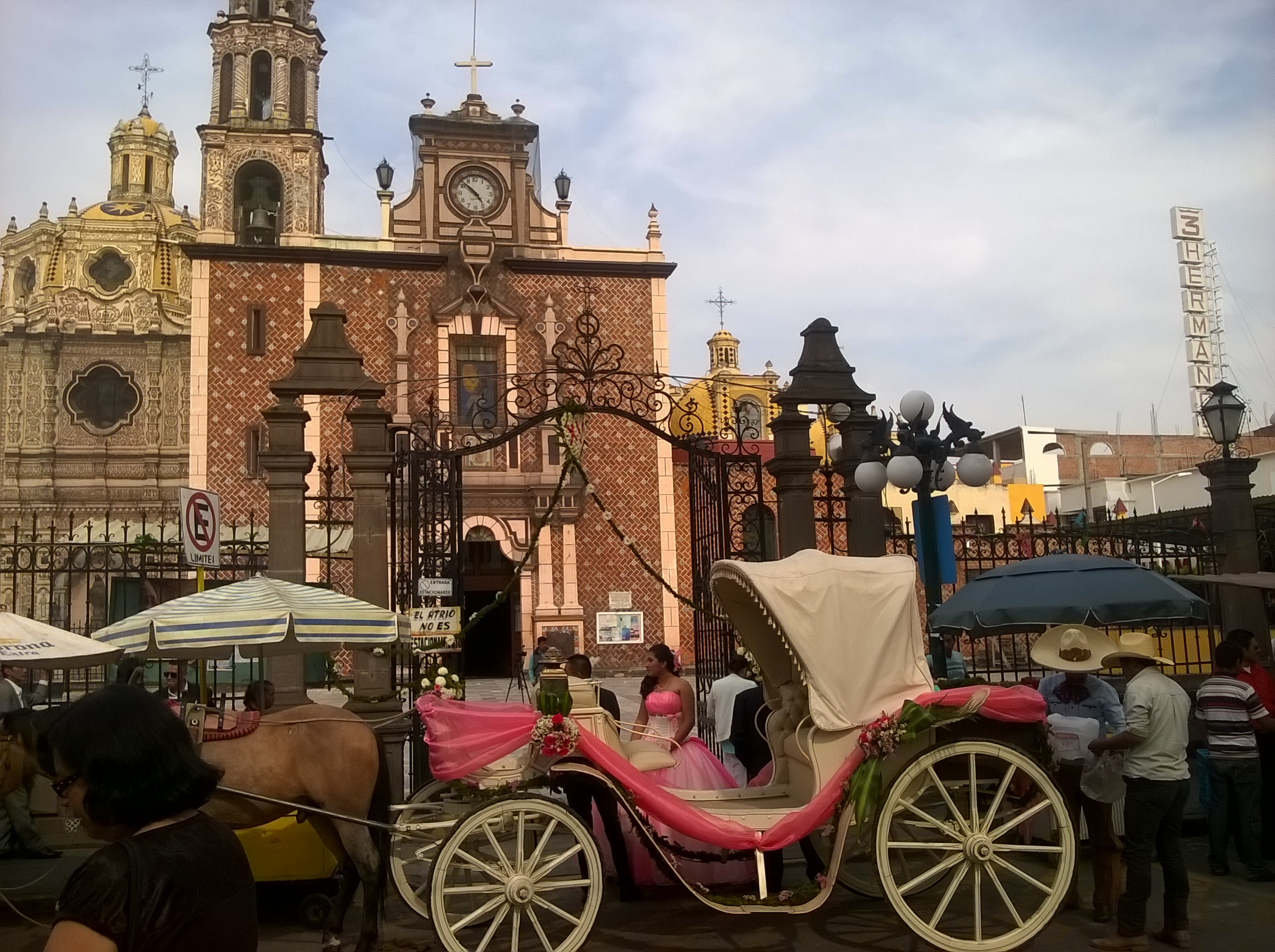
Parish

San Martín Texmelucan de Labastida is a city in the west-central part of the state of Puebla in Mexico, adjacent to the southwest corner of the state of Tlaxcala. It is the municipal seat of the municipality of San Martín Texmelucan. The city is the fifth-largest in the state of Puebla, with a 2020 census population of 155,738 inhabitants.

== History ==
On December 19, 2010, an oil pipeline at a Petroleos Mexicanos (Pemex) pumping station in the city exploded, killing at least 27 people and injuring more than 50. 32 houses were destroyed and several times that many damaged. The explosion is believed to have been caused by attempts to puncture the pipe to steal oil.
