= Alonso de Montúfar =

Spanish Dominican friar and prelate

The Most Reverend Alonso de Montúfar y Bravo de Laguanas, O.P.
- Archbishop of Mexico
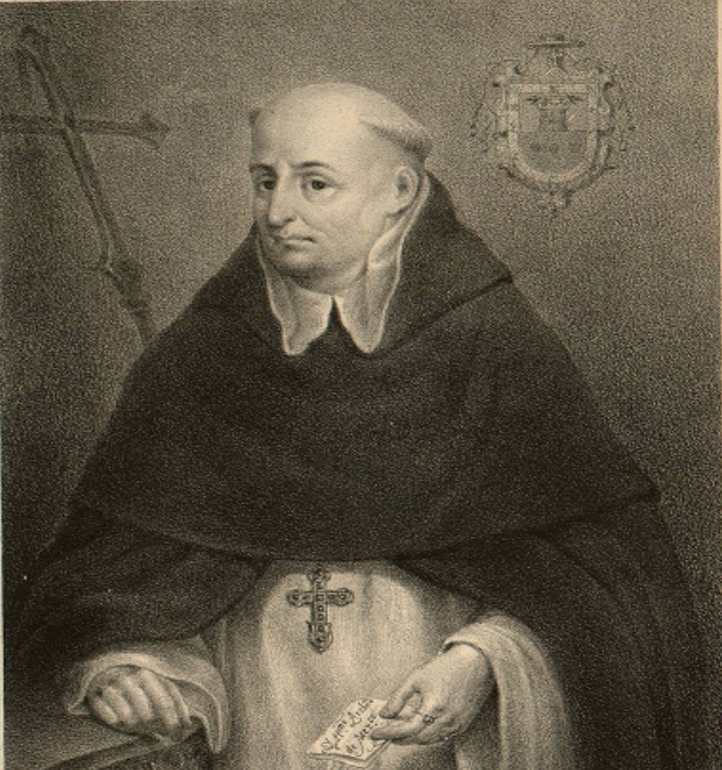
- See: Mexico
- Appointed: October 5, 1551
- Installed: October 5, 1551, June 1554
- Term ended: March 7, 1572
- Predecessor: Juan de Zumárraga
- Successor: Pedro Moya de Contreras

Orders
- Ordination: ca. 1515
- Consecration: 1553

Personal details
- Born: ca. 1489 Loja, Granada, Spain
- Died: March 7, 1572 (aged 82–83) Mexico City, New Spain (present-day Mexico)
- Denomination: Roman Catholic

Alonso de Montúfar y Bravo de Lagunas, O.P., was a Spanish Dominican friar and prelate of the Catholic Church, who ruled as the second Archbishop of Mexico from 1551 to his death in 1572. He approved and promoted the devotion to Our Lady of Guadalupe that arose during his reign.

== Early life ==
Montúfar was born in 1489 in Loja, Granada, in the region of Andalusia, just after the reconquest of the town from the Muslims. Following the chronicler Gil González Dávila, some authors give the year 1498 as Montúfar's year of birth, however, González Dávila contradicts himself, stating that Montúfar was 80 years old when he—erroneously—stated that the archbishop had died in 1569. Apart from this, there is another interesting note concerning Montúfar's date of birth; when his good friend and assistant, Friar Bartolomé de Ledesma, O.P., in a eulogy of the archbishop, writes that Montúfar had accepted the archbishopric in 1551, though he was over sixty years old. This note, together with the other evidence, indicates that Montúfar was born as early as 1489 or at least around that date.

== Dominican friar ==
Montúfar entered the Dominican Order and professed vows in the Priory of Santa Cruz la Real in Granada in 1512. Five years later, in 1517, he was assigned to Seville. The reason for his transfer was that the Dominican Archbishop Diego de Deza wanted him as one of the first fellows (colegiales) of the newly founded College of St. Thomas Aquinas in that city.

In 1524 Montúfar returned to his own college, Santa Cruz la Real, in Granada after seven years in Seville, and continued his education. In 1530, the General Chapter of the Dominican Order conferred on him the degree of Bachelor of Theology and appointed him as an instructor at the monastery for two years. After that term of office, the same body conferred on him the degree of Master of Theology. Following these years of teaching, Montúfar was appointed prior of Santa Cruz in 1536. At the end of his term of office, he went to Lyon, France, to attend the General Chapter of the Order.

Coming back to Spain in 1538, Montúfar was named prior of Santo Domingo el Real in Almería and from 1541 he was prior for two years in Santo Domingo in Murcia. By 1546, however, he was back in his old monastery in Granada, where he was appointed prior.

Apart from the appointments within the Dominican Order, Montúfar served for a long time as a theological consultant of the tribunals of the Inquisition in Granada, Murcia, Toledo and Seville.

== Archbishop of Mexico ==
After the death of the first Archbishop of Mexico, Franciscan Don Juan de Zumárraga, Dominican friar Montúfar was named as the new archbishop by Emperor Charles V. The recommendation of Montúfar as a candidate to the Mexican see seems to have come from Luis Hurtado de Mendoza y Pacheco, 2nd Marquis of Mondejar, who at the time was President of the Council of the Indies. According to the chroniclers the Marquis knew Montúfar personally, since he had been his confessor for some time. Alonso de Montúfar was consecrated in 1553 and finally reached his see in Mexico City in June 1554, six years after the death of his predecessor.

=== The Church in the Philippines ===
In the mid-1560s, Montúfar sent a secular priest, Juan de Vivero, the chaplain for the galleon San Geronimo, to the newly conquered Philippine Islands in order to establish the structures of the Catholic Church there. He was given the special privilege and sole faculty by Montúfar to establish the spiritual administration of this new colony of Spain. Vivero arrived in the islands in 1566, and founded the first Catholic church there, dedicated to the Immaculate Conception, later to become the cathedral of the Diocese of Manila after its establishment in 1579.

== Provincial Councils ==
After his arrival, Montúfar saw the convening of a provincial council as his greatest immediate goal. Already complaining about his advanced age and general fragility, Archbishop Montúfar wrote to the King that he wanted to convoke this assembly before his death, which he thought would come very soon. As a newcomer, the Archbishop thought it indispensable to meet his episcopal colleagues and the clergy, who had first-hand experience of the country. As Montúfar also thought that the young church in Mexico lacked both order and discipline, he considered it very important to establish a body of clear legal norms worthy of the new church province.

In 1546, the Holy See erected the Archdioceses of Santo Domingo, Mexico City and Lima. Consequently, the dioceses in the Indies ceased to be suffragans to the Archbishop of Seville and formed three new ecclesiastical provinces. This event marked the beginning of the golden age of the provincial councils. As Archbishop of Mexico, Montúfar summoned the bishops of his province to two such councils.

=== The First Provincial Council of Mexico, 1555 ===
On June 29, 1555, on the feast day of St. Peter and St. Paul, the first Provincial Council of Mexico was inaugurated at a ceremony in the cathedral of Mexico City, in the presence of the Archbishop and four of his suffragan bishops. Two of these suffragans were friars. Martín Sarmiento de Hojacastro, the bishop of Tlaxcala, was an experienced Franciscan missionary, and Tomás de Casillas, the bishop of Chiapas, was a fellow Dominican. The other two prelates were members of the secular clergy. Vasco de Quiroga had been a judge of the Mexican audiencia before being promoted to the Diocese of Michoacán, and Juan Lopez de Zárate had been Bishop of Antequera for twenty years. López de Zárate arrived at the Council severely ill and died before it was finished.

The final decrees of the first Mexican Council consist of 93 chapters. Most of these chapters dealt with instruction in Christian doctrine, the administering of sacraments and the enforcement of episcopal jurisdiction in the new territory. Another very important theme was the establishment of concrete and detailed norms for the education and life of the clergy.

=== The Second Provincial Council of Mexico, 1565 ===
The second Mexican Council was inaugurated on August 15, 1565, the feast of the Assumption, at which time the bishops swore an oath of obedience to the decrees of the Council of Trent (1545–1563). Apart from Montúfar and Bishop Casillas of Chiapas, the bishops from the first Council had died. As of 1555, the Dominican Bernardo de Alburquerque had become Bishop of Antequera and the Franciscan Francisco de Toral was installed as the first Bishop of Yucatán. In addition, Pedro de Ayala and Fernando de Villagómez, both secular clerics, had become the bishops of Guadalajara and Tlaxcala respectively. On November 11, a little less than two months after its inauguration, the second Council finished.

The acts of the second Council consist of 28 chapters, most of them clarifications on the decrees of the first Council. In a concluding note, the bishops stated that they wished to reaffirm the decisions of the first Council of Mexico and that the new Council should be seen as a complement of and not as a substitute for it.

== Mission and Church Policy ==
In letters written shortly after his arrival in Mexico, Montúfar presented a very gloomy picture of the state of the Church in New Spain. Despite three decades of missionary work, Montúfar argued that the greater part of the indigenous population was as pagan as it had been before the conquest and that the Church lacked both order and discipline. According to Montúfar, the bishop should be the absolute leader and teaching authority in the diocese, whereas the clergy, both friars and secular priests, should be their assistants.

Even if Montúfar sometimes admitted that the mendicant missionary Franciscans, Dominicans and Augustinians had done much for the evangelization of the Indians and that he as Archbishop could do very little without them, he felt that they had gained too much power and influence. On the other hand, Montúfar thought that he was entrusted with very little power and if the Archdiocese could be described as a patchwork of missionary parishes, known as doctrinas, most of them were outside the control of the prelate as friars administered them. Thus, Montúfar thought that a major change was needed. He wanted to construct a hierarchical church following the Spanish model, with a strong and influential episcopacy which could define the goals for the ministry.

According to the Archbishop, these doctrinas should be placed under the jurisdiction of the bishop, establishing legally binding links between the bishop and the clerics. To administer sacraments in a given location, all priests involved in the Indian ministry would need a license. In this way, Montúfar would be able to replace friars with secular clerics. According to Montúfar, the Indians learned the doctrine of the church as if they were parrots, without understanding its contents. With such a deficient knowledge of the basis of the Christian doctrine and infrequent contact with the sacraments of the Church, Montúfar doubted whether many of the Indians souls would be saved.

Montúfar thought that the friars occupied areas of the archdiocese that were too vast without having the personnel necessary for the ministry. In Montúfar's eyes, the greatest problem for the Church in New Spain was the extreme lack of priests. Sometimes Montúfar asserted that ten times as many priests were needed in order to teach the Christian doctrine and administer the sacraments to the native population. Montúfar wanted to replace mendicants with secular priests, who unquestionably were under episcopal jurisdiction. The hope for the Church in New Spain would be to educate a large number of priests, particularly among the young Spanish men who were born in New Spain (criollos), many of whom already knew the indigenous languages. To meet the needs of the Indian ministry, Montúfar wanted to build a seminary in Mexico City, where a large number of young criollos could be educated and later serve as priests.

According to Montúfar, this lack of priests could not be solved unless the Indians contributed to the economy of the diocesan Church through the payment of general tithes. Overall, Montúfar had a negative view of the indigenous population and their abilities. Like many other churchmen, he thought that the Indians were pusillanimous and weak and that they were easily led astray. He also thought them to be particularly inclined to drunkenness and fornication. If there were no priests living in the village, he believed that the Indians would easily become victims of the native religious experts (hechiceros), who would lure them back to their old beliefs and ceremonies.

On their part the friars also argued that they were entitled to build and remove churches and friaries without license from the Archbishop, as they were beyond his jurisdiction. They wanted "straw-bishops" with little more than honorary powers, who could ordain the priests necessary for the ministry and bless ornaments and churches. Thus, the friars did not accept the appointment of secular clerics by the bishop in areas they already administered. In general, the friars doubted the zeal and aptitude of the secular clerics and thought that the clerics were either too greedy or too uneducated to be entrusted with the sensitive Indian ministry.

If the Archbishop did manage to introduce his ideal view of the church, the mendicants thought that there was no future for the church in New Spain. The friars particularly opposed the introduction of separate Indian tithes, as that would have devastating effects on the already poor and tax-burdened Indians. If the Indians were forced to pay tithes, the friars thought that they would despise the Church and its ministers and think that they were driven by greed and not by love for their souls. In addition, the Indians were already contributing to the subsistence of the clergy through the payment of tribute to the Crown or an encomendero. The introduction of secular clerics would also be very expensive, since the clerics often had to support large numbers of relatives. Apart from this, the friars argued that the imposition of tithes would only contribute to the enrichment of the bishops and the cathedral chapter, as only a fraction of the tithe revenues were destined to the ordinary clergy. In short, the friars thought that the introduction of secular priests and the imposition of tithes would rapidly destroy all that they had built up since they had arrived in New Spain.

== Montúfar and the cult of Our Lady of Guadalupe ==
One of the first sources of the cultus of Our Lady of Guadalupe at Tepeyac in the outskirts of the city of Mexico was a collection of testimonies against the Franciscan Minister Provincial Francisco de Bustamante, which was drawn up by Montúfar in 1556. The document is often referred to as the Informacíon.

According to this document a cult of the Virgin Mary under the name of Guadalupe had been initiated at Tepeyac not long before 1556. Several of the witnesses testify that the cult was "new" and that it was very popular among the inhabitants of the city. Many people, both Spaniards and Indians, and men and women from all social strata, traveled to Tepeyac to pay devotion to Our Lady and the image of her that had been placed there, and gave great amounts of alms. Also, miracles had been reported. Nevertheless, the witnesses stress specifically the piety of upper-class Spaniards who made pilgrimages to Tepeyac and entered the chapel on their bare knees. In the document, the church building at Tepeyac is referred to as an ermita, a word signifying a chapel of ease, often to be found in rural areas or in the outskirts of a town and without resident clergy.

The conflict between the Archbishop and the Franciscan Minister Provincial on the cult at Tepeyac began in early September 1556. On Sunday September 6, Montúfar preached in the cathedral about a text from the Gospel of St. Luke. The sermon centered on the devotion faithful Catholics should have for the Mother of God. According to witnesses, Montúfar expressed his pleasure that many people in various parts of the world held images of the Virgin Mary in high esteem. He was also pleased to note the devotion that the inhabitants of the City of Mexico showed for Our Lady of Guadalupe in her temple at Tepeyac and thought that the Spaniards' devotion would surely have edifying effects on the Indians, who he thought did not show such great affection for Our Lady.

The following Tuesday, September 8, on the feast day of the Nativity of Mary, the Franciscan Minister Provincial, Francisco de Bustamante, preached on the Virgin in the Chapel of San José de los Naturales, commonly called the Indians' chapel, the original shrine built to honor the Virgin. By the end of his sermon, the Provincial had dealt with the new cult of Our Lady of Guadalupe at Tepeyac and some of the witnesses noted that the Provincial then had become very angry and that his face turned red. In opposition to the Archbishop, he affirmed that the Indians were very much devoted to the Virgin. In fact, their devotion was so great, that they thought that the Virgin was a goddess, instead of the Mother of God. Bustamante said that Archbishop Montúfar was totally mistaken in approving the cult, which would have devastating effects on the indigenous population. The friar asserted that the position of the Archbishop threatened to uproot the fragile Christianity of the indigenous population.

Bustamante also thought that the alleged thaumaturgic effect of the picture was a hoax and questioned how a picture "painted yesterday by an Indian could perform miracles." Only one of the witnesses, Alonso Sánchez de Cisneros, stated that he knew the name of this indigenous artist: Marcos. Though nothing more than his Christian name was rendered, it has often been assumed that this Marcos was an indigenous painter called Marcos de Aquino, who had been trained by the Franciscans in Tlatelolco. According to the testimony of Juan de Salazar, Bustamante continued, stating that he:

did not know what effect the said devotion had, because it would contradict what he and other members of religious orders with much sweat had been preaching to the natives of this country. Because it would be to convince them that this image of Our Lady of Guadalupe performed miracles and if some lame, blind or crippled Indians went there with the intention [to get cured] and they turned back without being cured, or getting even worse because of the walk, they would make jokes about it/her [the cult/the Virgin] and it would thus be better to take away this devotion, because of the scandal of the natives.

The Provincial urged that the purported miracles be thoroughly investigated before they were made public. If the miracles were found to be groundless, Bustamante thought that the inventor ought to be severely punished. According to the Archbishop's witnesses, Bustamante's harsh criticism of the popular devotion had caused "scandal and murmuring" among the listeners and other people. One of the witnesses even stated that he had become so indignant by the Provincial's words that he had left the church during the sermon.

At least from the mid-1550s onwards, the ermita of the Virgin of Guadalupe at Tepeyac became an important site for pilgrimages. Both Spanish colonists and Indians from the city of Mexico and its environs went there to pay devotion to Our Lady, to do penitence and to be cured from illnesses that afflicted them. Just as in the case of Our Lady of Guadalupe in Extremadura, the Virgin of Tepeyac was celebrated specifically on the feast of the Nativity of Our Lady in September. At that time, the Archbishop and the cathedral chapter took part in a solemn procession to Tepeyac. This procession is a clear testimony of the importance of the cult towards the end of Montúfar's archiepiscopacy.

== Montúfar's last years and death ==
From the latter part of the year 1570, the Archbishop, aged 81, hardly left his bed, due to severe illness. Being unable to fulfil any work, he appointed his longtime friend and assistant, Ledesma, as the Vicar General of the Archdiocese. Montúfar died on March 7, 1572.

While Bishop, Montúfar was the principal consecrator of Pedro de Ayala, Bishop of Guadalajara (1562); Bernardo de Albuquerque, Bishop of Antequera, Oaxaca (1562); and Jerónimo de Corella, Bishop of Comayagua (1563).

== Sources ==
- Magnus Lundberg, Unification and Conflict: The Church Politics of Alonso de Montúfar OP, Archbishop of Mexico, 1554-1572. Uppsala: Swedish Institute of Mission Research 2002. [See also fulltext version online

Religious titles
Preceded by Juan de Zumárraga	Archbishop of Mexico; 1551–1572	Succeeded by Pedro Moya de Contreras
