= Second Mexican Provincial Council =

The Second Mexican Provincial Council was a 1565 provincial council of the Catholic Church in the Archdiocese of Mexico.

== Topics ==
Alonso de Montúfar, the archbishop of Mexico, convened the council on November 8, 1565. A major topic was the implementation of the decrees of the Council of Trent.

The council petitioned Philip II of Spain to reduce the number of Indians allowed to work as musicians. It reiterated the decree of the First Mexican Provincial Council that natives could not be ordained as priests. Seminarians were instructed to own the Manual de confesores y penitentes of Martín de Azpilcueta.
