= Pustunich =

Town in the Mexican state of Yucatán

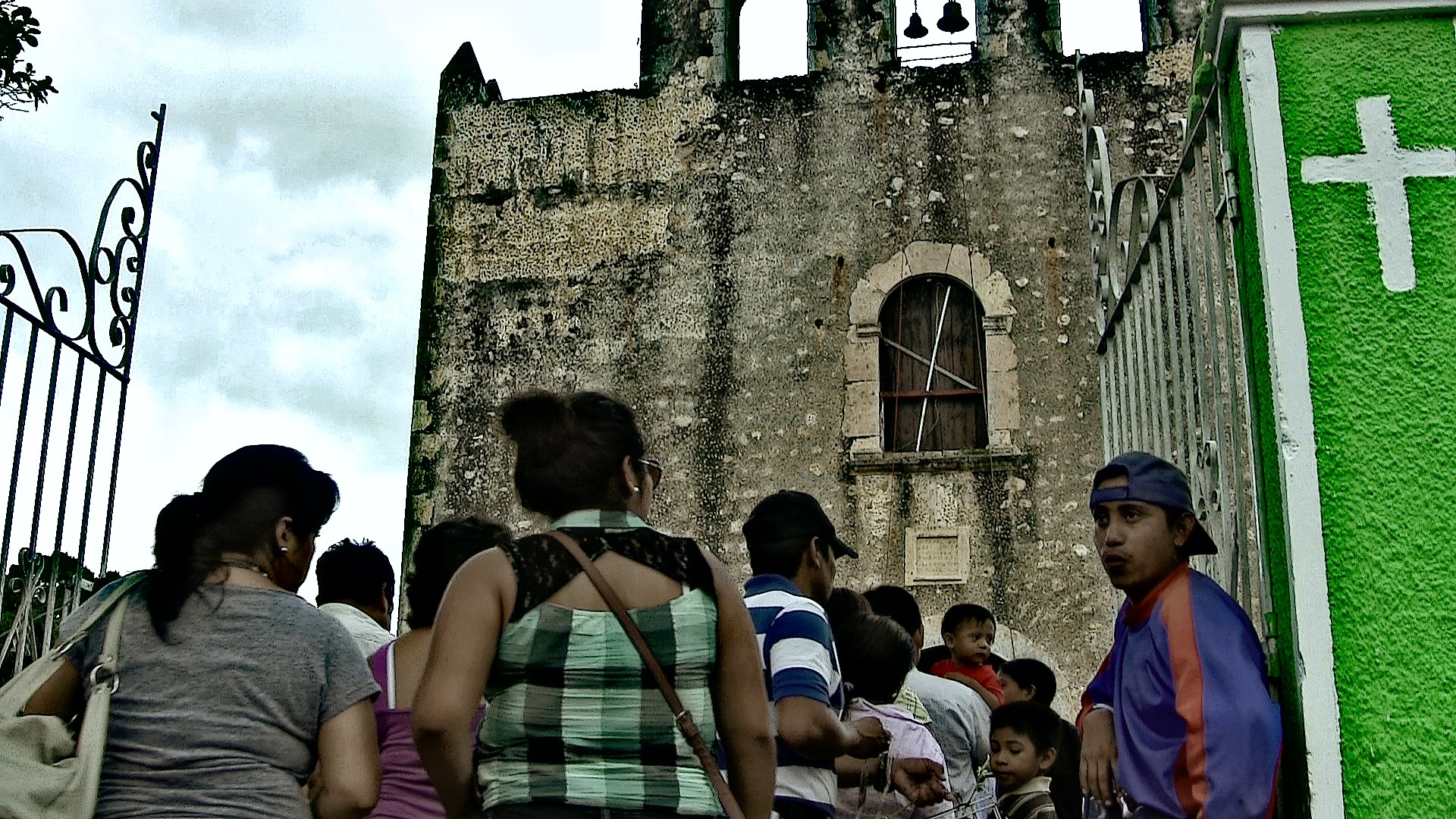
- In front of the church in Pustunich, 2015

- Location within Yucatán (state)
- Coordinates: 20°22′4″N 89°30′46″W
- Country: Mexico
- State: Yucatán
- Municipality: Ticul

Population (2010)
  - Total: 2,480

Pustunich is a town located in the Ticul Municipality, Yucatán in Mexico. It is located 86 km from the state capital, Mérida, and 3 km southeast from Ticul.
