= Napuc Chi =

- Died: c. AD 1541
- Citizenship: Mayan
- Occupation: Noble

Napuc Chi (died ca. 1541), often known by his title Ah Kin Chi (where Ah Kin, or in modern orthography Aj K'in is a title meaning "priest" or "sacerdote") was a Yucatec Maya noble from Maní. Other names used in source texts for this individual include Chi Ah Kin and Kinchil Coba. He was general-in-chief of the army of Tutul-Xiu, king of Maní, and won a good military reputation during the war against the Spaniards, whom he defeated in several battles. When Tutul Xiu submitted to the Spanish conquerors, he sent envoys to all the caciques in Yucatan, to invite them to make peace also; and for this purpose Ah Kin Chi and other noblemen were directed to visit King Cocóm at Zotuta, and this chief received them with apparent regard, entertaining them with a splendid hunting party and banquet, at the end of which all the envoys were beheaded by order and in presence of Cocóm. Ah Kin Chi was the only one spared, in order to make him suffer what they considered the most ignominious punishment, that of cutting his eyes out and scalping him. In this condition he was taken to the Mani frontier and left there until some Indians took him before his king. He died a few months afterward. In 1599 the king of Spain gave a pension of $200 to Gaspar Antonio Chi, son of Ah Kin Chi and grandson of Tutul Xiu.
