= Maní Municipality =

Municipality in the Mexican state of Yucatán

Maní
- Municipality
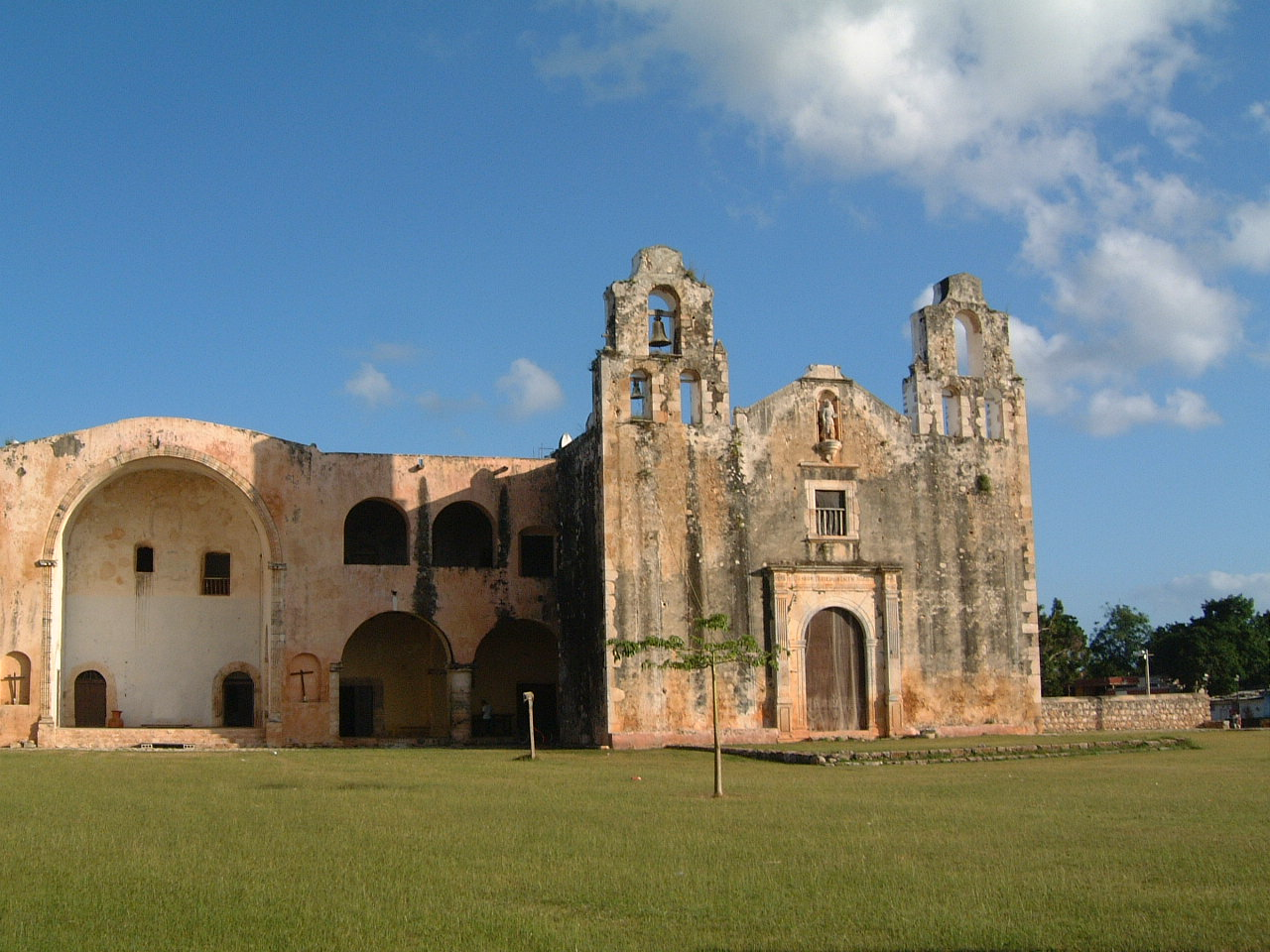
- Principal Church of Maní, Yucatán

- Region 7 Sur #047

- Location of the Municipality in Mexico
- Coordinates: 20°23′11″N 89°23′25″W
- Country: Mexico
- State: Yucatán
- Mexico Ind.: 1821
- Yucatán Est.: 1824

Government
  - Type: 2012–2015
  - Municipal President: Santos Roman Dzul Beh

Area
  - Total: 85.59 km^{2} (33.05 sq mi)
- Elevation: 26 m (85 ft)

Population (2010)
  - Total: 5,250
  - Density: 61.3/km^{2} (159/sq mi)
  - Demonym: Umanense
- Time zone: UTC-6 (Central Standard Time)
- INEGI Code: 047
- Major Airport: Merida (Manuel Crescencio Rejón) International Airport
- IATA Code: MID
- ICAO Code: MMMD

Maní Municipality (In the Yucatec Maya Language: 'Place where everything happened', properly 'to travel or walk to some place’, that is, pasar caminando a alguna parte; desfilar; transitar) is a municipality in the Mexican state of Yucatán containing 85.59 km^{2} of land and is located roughly 90 km south of the city of Mérida.

== History ==
In the pre-Hispanic period the area was part of the chieftainship of Tutul Xiu and it was a ceremonial center, where the annual festival to Kukulcan was held. At the conquest, Maní became part of the encomienda system with its lands assigned to the Spanish Crown, which was still the sole trustee in 1565.

In 1562, Franciscan priest Diego de Landa ordered an Inquisition in Maní ending with a ceremony called the auto-da-fé, where the Maya were whipped and ceremonial objects and Maya codices were burned. Much of the heritage of the Maya was lost due to these actions.

Yucatán declared its independence from the Spanish Crown in 1821, and in 1825 the area was assigned to the Tekax Municipality. In 1867 it passed to the Ticul Municipality and in 1931 became the head of its own municipality.

== Governance ==
The municipal president is elected for a three-year term. The town council has four councilpersons, who serve as Secretary and councilors of public works, potable water and ecology.

The Municipal Council administers the business of the municipality. It is responsible for budgeting and expenditures and producing all required reports for all branches of the municipal administration. Annually it determines educational standards for schools.

The Police Commissioners ensure public order and safety. They are tasked with enforcing regulations, distributing materials and administering rulings of general compliance issued by the council.

== Communities ==
The head of the municipality is Maní, Yucatán. Besides the seat, the populated areas of the municipality include: Miramar, Mópila, Póh Chuu, San Chakán, San José, San Pedro, San Rafael, San Román, San Simón, Santa Amalia, Santa Ana, Santa Antonia, Santa Cruz, Santa Rosa, Santa Teresa, Santa Ursula and Tipikal. The significant populations are shown below:

Community	Population
Entire Municipality (2010)	5,250
Maní	3915 in 2005
Tipikal	921 in 2005

== Local festivals ==
Every year from 15 to 24 August 24, a celebration is held in honor of the Virgin of the Assumption and from 27 December to 3 January is a festival for the Virgen de la Candelaria.

== Tourist attractions ==
- Church and former Convent of San Miguel Archangel, built during the sixteenth century and where the auto-da-fé occurred.
- Former monastery of la Candelaria
- Chapel of San Juan, built in the eighteenth century
- Chapel of Santa Lucia, built in the eighteenth century
- Chapel of Santiago, built in the eighteenth century
- Church of the Magdalena, built in the sixteenth century (in Tipikal)
