= Francisco de Toral =

Spanish missionary and bishop

Most Reverend Francisco de Toral
- Bishop of Yucatán
- Church: Catholic Church
- Diocese: Diocese of Yucatán
- Predecessor: None
- Successor: Diego de Landa

Orders
- Consecration: May 24, 1562 by Sancho Díaz de Trujillo

Personal details
- Born: 1502
- Died: April 20, 1571 (age 69)

Francisco de Toral, O.F.M. (1502–1571) was a Franciscan missionary in New Spain, and the first Bishop of Yucatán.

== Biography ==
De Toral was ordained a priest in the Order of Friars Minor. On November 19, 1561, Francisco de Toral was appointed by Pope Pius IV the first bishop of the Diocese of Yucatán and consecrated bishop on May 24, 1562 by Sancho Díaz de Trujillo, Auxiliary Bishop of Plasencia, with Fernando de Villagómez, Bishop of Tlaxcala, and Juan de Vaca, Bishop of Panamá, serving as co-consecrators.

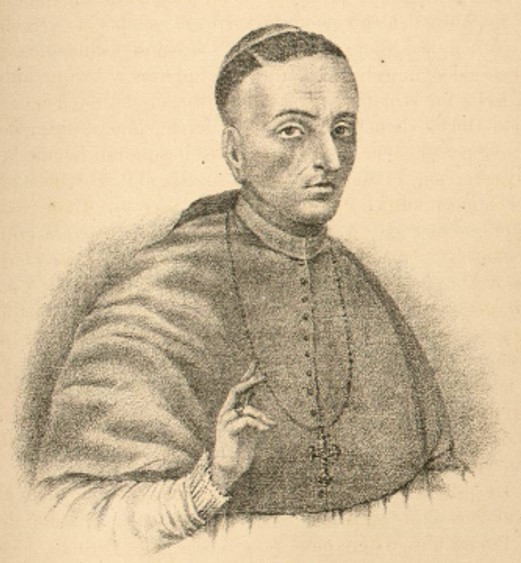
Portrait of Francisco de Toral

As part of his effort to Christianize the Indians of New Spain, Toral learned to speak the Nahuatl and Popoloca languages, and compiled a dictionary and grammar of the latter. He also charged Bernardino de Sahagún with the creation of the Historia General de las Cosas de Nueva España. In Yucatán he led an investigation into the alleged abuses of the Maya by Diego de Landa, employing Gaspar Antonio Chi as his interpreter; Landa would eventually be acquitted, and follow Toral as Bishop of Yucatán. He claimed that crosses were being burned, and human sacrifices were made in church. In the end, Mayans were considered innocent, based on the lack of proof. Francisco de Toral requested his position be terminated, but his request was denied. Following this denial, he moved to Mexico City and lived there until his death on April 20, 1571.

== Experiences in Yucatán ==
Before Toral arrived in the Yucatán, Landa arrived in 1549 and ordered the destruction of more than 20,000 Mayan artifacts that were determined to be cult images over his time in the region. In addition to his overseeing of these artifacts’ destruction, he actively tortured Mayans in order to produce confessions of idolatry. Mayans that confessed to idol worship faced severe penalties, ranging from flogging to ten years of forced labor for minor offenses.

Toral arrived in 1562 to a province that was in a great state of unrest. There was a large controversy among Mayans and secular government officials with regards to Landa’s treatment of allegedly idolatrous Indians. Toral was shocked by the violent behavior of the Franciscan friars. He believed that the clergy had both a right and duty to physically punish Mayans resisting conversion, but Toral was skeptical that the confessions Landa elicited were legitimate and the resulting punishments were an overreaction to the situation. In Toral’s eyes, Landa was doing work outside of the position he had been designated. With this conflict began a period of distrust between Toral and the Franciscans of the Yucatán.

In response to these events, Toral forced Landa’s return to Spain in 1563 in order to answer the accusations that were being drawn against him. As Toral began to exercise his authority, he freed hundreds of Mayans that Landa had imprisoned. Under his supervision only the most extreme cases of idolatry were investigated, and even those resulted in fairly light sentences. In addition to this, Toral began to cooperate more with local secular authorities in order for his religious order to be as effective as possible. He removed Franciscan missionary clergy from the administration of ecclesiastical justice, urging his secular clergy to use verbal persuasion to draw Mayans away from idolatry.

Toral’s distrust of Franciscans and his inability to control the friars still holding authority resulted in a large amount of tension between himself, the Franciscan order, and local government authorities, namely Governor Luis de Céspedes y Oviedo. Charges were brought against him by Governor Céspedes for usurping royal jurisdiction as animosity towards him as a religious leader began to grow. Landa was eventually absolved of his charges in 1569. Following this and his ongoing dilemmas in Yucatán, Toral requested he be relocated to serve in Mexico City before ultimately abdicating his position in 1570 and dying in Mexico.

== External links and additional sources ==
- Cheney, David M. "Archdiocese of Yucatán". Catholic-Hierarchy.org. (for Chronology of Bishops) ^{[self-published]}
- Chow, Gabriel. "Metropolitan Archdiocese of Yucatán". GCatholic.org. (for Chronology of Bishops) ^{[self-published]}

Catholic Church titles
Preceded by Diego de Estremera	Guardian of Tecamachalco; 1548–1550	Succeeded by Juan de Vesar
Preceded by Buenaventura de Salinas	Guardian of Tecamachalco; 1556–1557	Succeeded by Alonso de Molina
Preceded by Francisco de Bustamante	Provincial of the Province of the Holy Gospel; 1558–1561	Succeeded by Francisco de Bustamante
New diocese	Bishop of Yucatán; 1561–1571	Succeeded by Diego de Landa
