= Manuel Castro Ruiz =

Mexican Bishop

- Archbishop of Archdiocese of Yucatán (Emeritus)
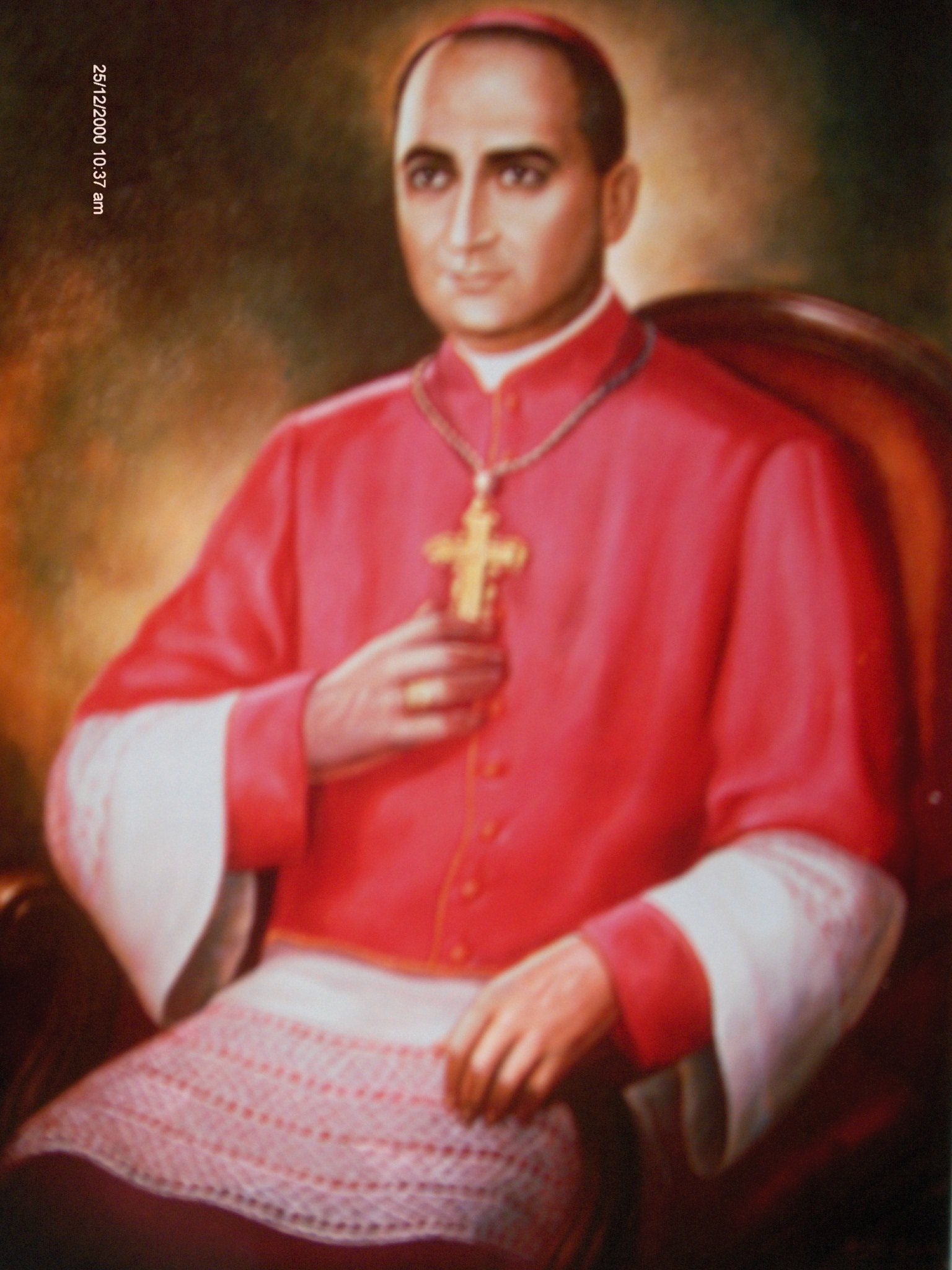
- Church: Roman Catholic Church
- See: Archdiocese of Yucatán
- In office: 1969–1995
- Predecessor: Fernando Ruiz y Solózarno
- Successor: Emilio Carlos Berlie Belaunzarán
- Previous post(s): Auxiliary Bishop of Archdiocese of Yucatán; Bishop

Orders
- Ordination: June 19, 1943

Personal details
- Born: November 9, 1918; Morelia, Michoacán, Mexico
- Died: November 18, 2008 (aged 90)

Manuel Castro Ruiz (November 9, 1918 – November 18, 2008) was a Mexican Bishop of the Roman Catholic Church.

He was born in Morelia, Michoacán, where he was ordained a priest on June 19, 1943. He was appointed Auxiliary Bishop of the Archdiocese of Yucatán on July 21, 1965, along with Titular Bishop of Cincari and was ordained a bishop on December 27, 1965. Mons. Manuel Castro Ruiz, he was a Council Father, attended the Second Vatican Council on 11 October 1962 to 8 December 1965. In 1993, he was the host of Pope John Paul II, who visited Yucatán. Being the first state visit, to restore the diplomatic relations of Mexico and the Vatican.

Castro Ruiz was appointed as Archbishop of the Archdiocese of Yucatán on September 20, 1969, and retired from there on March 15, 1995.

== External links and additional sources ==
- Cheney, David M. "Archdiocese of Yucatán". Catholic-Hierarchy.org. (for Chronology of Bishops)^{self-published}
- Chow, Gabriel. "Metropolitan Archdiocese of Yucatán". GCatholic.org. (for Chronology of Bishops)^{self-published}
- Catholic-Hierarchy
- Yucatán Diocese (in Spanish)
