= Yotholín =

Town in the Mexican state of Yucatán

- Location within Yucatán (state)
- Coordinates: 20°19′35″N 89°27′18″W
- Country: Mexico
- State: Yucatán
- Municipality: Ticul

Population (2010)
  - Total: 2,035

Yotholín is a town located in the Ticul Municipality, Yucatán in Mexico.
