= Gaspar Antonio Chi =

- Born: c. 1531; City of Maní, Tutul-Xiu (modern-day Mexico)
- Died: c. 1610 (aged 69); Mérida, Captaincy General of Yucatán, New Spain
- Citizenship: Mayan
- Occupations: linguist, writer

Gaspar Antonio Chi (c. 1531–1610; also known as Gaspar Antonio de Herrera) was a Maya noble of Mani. Gaspar Antonio was of the Chi chibal (lineage) through his father Napuc Chi, and the Xiu chibal through his mother, Ix Kukil Xiu. He worked primarily as a translator between Spanish and Maya, and is thought to have been an important source of information for Diego de Landa in writing his Relación de las cosas de Yucatán.

Educated by Fray Diego de Landa, from whom he learned the Castilian grammar that he mastered with such perfection that he was named by the Spanish as head of the grammar chair in the chapel of Tizimín, a town in the north of Yucatán where he lived. He also learned and mastered Nahuatl and Latin. With this knowledge he was a valuable help to the Franciscan friars who were in charge of the evangelization of the Yucatán Peninsula and for this purpose he had access - normally denied to native people - to the library of the Convent of San Francisco de Mérida.

He was also organist of the Yucatán cathedral and received the appointment of general interpreter of the Yucatán Government's Superior Court. He served as general attorney for the Mayan people, intervening in their disputes and defending them in litigation.
