= Julián Garcés =

Spanish Dominican priest

His Excellency, The Most Reverend Julián Garcés OP
- Bishop de Tlaxcala
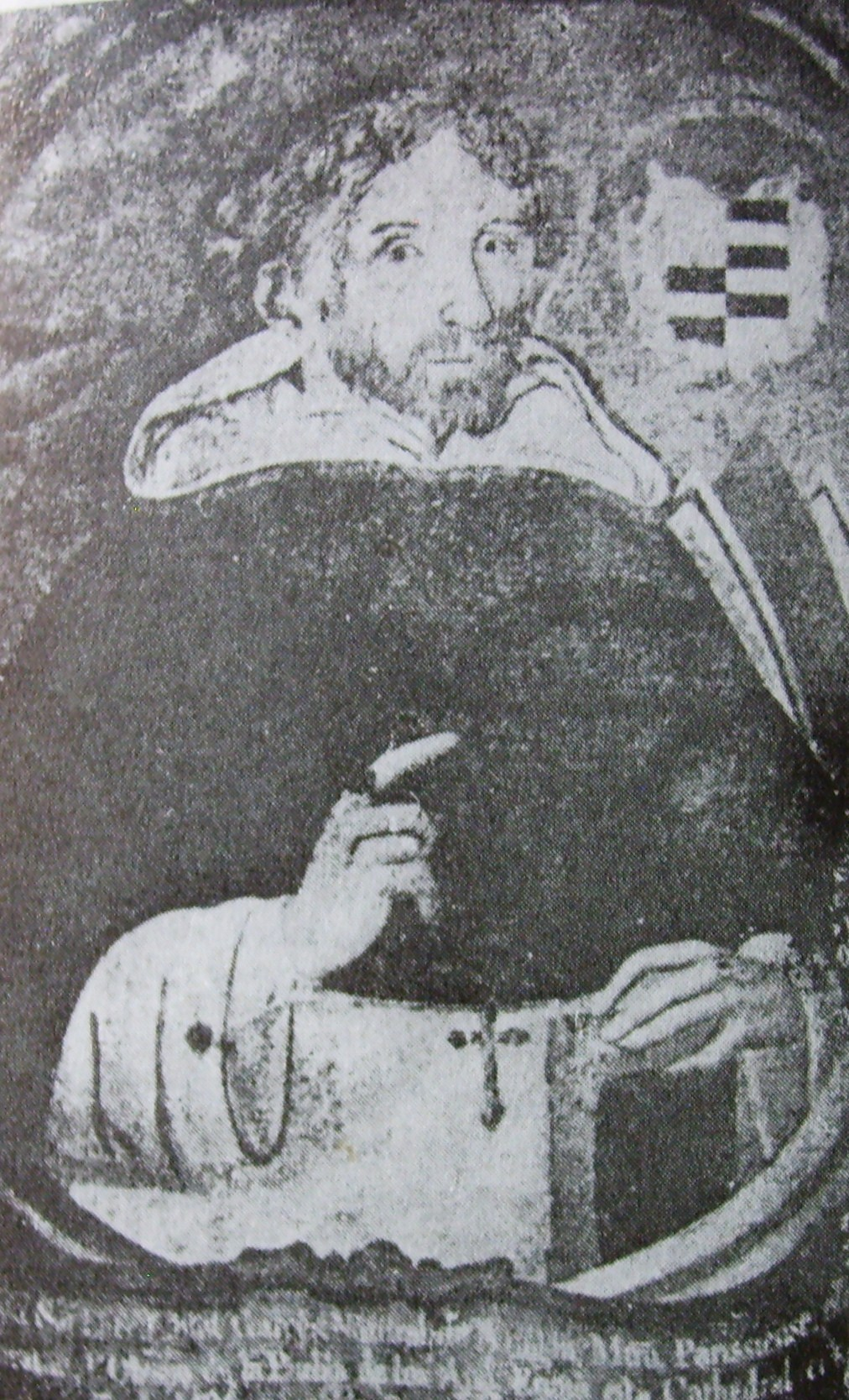
- Church: Catholic Church
- Diocese: Diocese of Carolense (Yucatán); Diocese of Tlaxcala (Puebla de los Ángeles)
- In office: 13 October 1525 - 7 December 1542
- Predecessor: Position created
- Successor: Pablo Gil de Talavera

Personal details
- Born: 1452 Munébrega, Kingdom of Aragon
- Died: 7 December 1542 (aged 90) Tlaxcala, New Spain

Julián Garcés, O.P. was a Spanish Dominican prelate born in Munébrega in the Kingdom of Aragon. He was made Bishop of Yucatán in 1519 and subsequently the first acting Bishop of Tlaxcala from 1525 to 1542.

== Biography ==
Garcés took the vows in the convent of the Orden de Santo Domingo in Calatayud. He studied at the University of Salamanca and the Sorbonne in Paris, then taught theology in the convent of Zaragoza, where he received his master's degree. He then studied philosophy, theology, and Latin in Paris. He was the royal chaplain of Charles I of Spain, V of the Holy Roman Empire and head of the Dominican Order in Aragon.

He was named bishop of the new diocese of Yucatán, in New Spain, the 1519 royal provision reading, "We present you (Rev. Father Julián Garcés) to the Bishopric of Yucatán and Santa María de los Remedios", having been recommended by Carlos's ecclesiastical advisers. However, with new information about the new territory's geography, in 1525, Pope Clement VII named him bishop of Tlaxcala, writing, "We grant you and the bishops who shall succeed you, that you call yourselves not bishops of Santa María (de los Remedios or of Yucatán) but 'Tenuxtitlan' and of other lands to be mentioned."

Garcés chose the city of Tlaxcala as his episcopal seat. Despite his old age, he did not hesitate in setting out for the West Indies, taking possession of his episcopal see two years later. In his time in the tlaxcalan bishopric, he stood out for his care taken in the protection of the natives, as well as the erection of temples and welfare services. The fruit of these endeavors was the construction of a hospital on the 'Camino de Veracruz' and of the cathedral of Puebla de los Ángeles, the name that his diocese would later adopt.

Garcés is one of the Aragonese who participated in the early missionary and colonial action of the Spanish Crown in New Spain, taking an active part in the controversy concerning the natives, the result of which was a letter to Pope Paul III in defense of the "Indios". He died in his see of a malarial fever at the age of 89.

== Work ==
- Epístola ad SS. Dom. Nost. Paulum III Pontificem Maximum in Gratiam Indorum. Ilustratio omnium operum Divi Augustini, Notis marginalibus a se ipso factis
- Ilustratio omnium operum Divi Augustini, Notis marginalibus á se ipso factis

== Sources ==
- Biblioteca Virtual de Aragón. Accessed 26 February 2024.

== External links and additional sources ==
- Biografía del obispo Garcés
- Cheney, David M. "Archdiocese of Yucatán". Catholic-Hierarchy.org. (for Chronology of Bishops) ^{[self-published]}
- Chow, Gabriel. "Metropolitan Archdiocese of Yucatán". GCatholic.org. (for Chronology of Bishops) ^{[self-published]}
- Cheney, David M. "Archdiocese of Puebla de los Ángeles, Puebla". Catholic-Hierarchy.org. (for Chronology of Bishops) ^{[self-published]}
- Chow, Gabriel. "Metropolitan Archdiocese of Puebla de los Ángeles (Mexico)". GCatholic.org. (for Chronology of Bishops) ^{[self-published]}
