= Archdiocese of Yucatán =

Diocese of the Catholic Church based in Mérida, Yucatán, Mexico

Coordinates: 20.9671°N 89.6227°W

Archdiocese of Yucatán Archidioecesis Yucatanensis Arquidiócesis de Yucatán
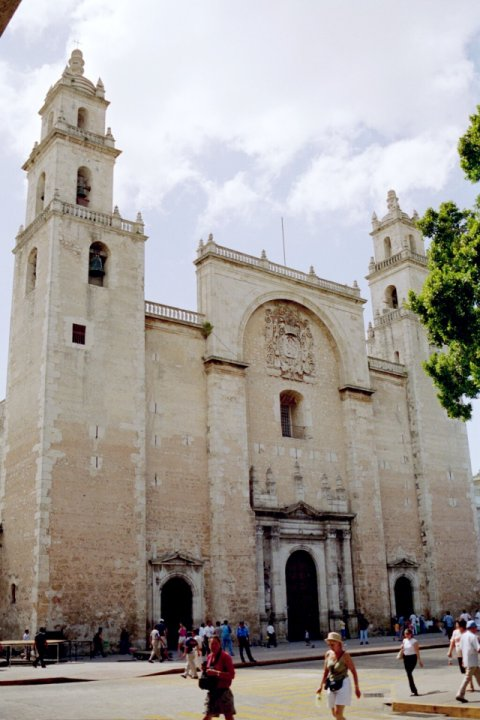
- Metropolitan Cathedral of St. Ildephonsus

Location
- Country: Mexico
- Ecclesiastical province: Yucatán

Statistics
- Area: 15,229 sq mi (39,440 km^{2})
- Population: Total; Catholics: (as of 2010); 1,990,000; 1,743,000 (87.6%)
- Parishes: 103

Information
- Denomination: Catholic
- Sui iuris church: Latin Church
- Rite: Roman Rite
- Established: 19 November 1561 (463 years ago)
- Cathedral: Cathedral of St. Ildephonsus

Current leadership
- Pope: Leo XIV
- Archbishop: Gustavo Rodríguez Vega
- Auxiliary Bishops: José Rafael Palma Capetillo
- Bishops emeritus: Emilio Carlos Berlie Belaunzarán

Map

Website
- arquidiocesisdeyucatan.org.mx

The Roman Catholic Archdiocese of Yucatán (Latin: Archidioecesis Yucatanensis) is an archdiocese of the Catholic Church based in Mérida, Yucatán, Mexico. The diocese of Campeche, the diocese of Cancún-Chetumal and the diocese of Tabasco are its suffragans. Its area is that of the state of the same name, covering an area of 17,204 square miles.

== History ==
Yucatán was the first region of the Mexican territory to encounter Christianity in the 16th century; it was there that the first Roman Catholic Mass was celebrated. It is said that in 1517 Francisco Hernández de Córdoba, the discoverer and explorer of the region, founded the first parish. Pope Leo X, believing the newly discovered land to be an island, by the papal bull Sacri apostolatus ministerio, dated 27 January 1518, created the Diocese of Yucatán, under the name Carolense and placed it under the protection of Our Lady of the Remedies (Santa Maria de los Remedios).

When it became known that Yucatán was part of the continent which Hernán Cortés was conquering, Pope Clement VII made certain modifications, and Dominican friar Julián Garcés, was transferred from his office of Bishop of Yucatán to that of Bishop of Tlaxcala (now the Archdiocese of Puebla de los Angeles) when he arrived in Mexico, as the Spanish had abandoned the conquest of Yucatán for this new land. The first resident bishop was Francisco Toral, a Franciscan friar, who took possession on 15 August 1562, one year after his appointment; he assisted at the first and second Mexican Provincial Councils.

Marcos de Torres y Rueda, the 12th bishop (1647), owing to dissensions between Juan de Palafox y Mendoza, Bishop of Puebla, and Viceroy García Sarmiento de Sotomayor, 2nd conde de Salvatierra, was named Viceroy of New Spain and entered into office 13 May 1648; he died at the capital, 22 April 1649.

Juan Gómez de Parada, the 20th bishop, governed the dioceses of Yucatán, Guatemala, and Guadalajara with great success. His successor, Ignacio Castorena y Ursúa, was the founder of the first newspaper published in Mexico. José María Guerra, 35th bishop (d. 1863), lived during the famous Caste War, which ruined almost the whole of Yucatán. It was at the instance of Leandro Rodríguez de la Gala, his successor, that the new See of Tabasco was formed from parishes taken from the Diocese of Yucatán. The Province and Vicariate of Petén, situated in Guatemala, which ecclesiastically had belonged to Yucatán, became a part of the See of Guatemala. Believing that the colony of Belize was his dependency, the bishop sent missionaries there in 1864; this land, however, had been under the administration of priests sent form the Vicariate Apostolic of Jamaica since 1837. The Diocese of Yucatán was suffragan of Mexico until 1891, when it became suffragan of the newly created Archdiocese of Oaxaca. In 1895 the new See of Campeche was created from parishes taken from Yucatán, to which was added all the territory of Quintana Roo.

== Bishops ==
Ordinaries of Diocese of Carolense

- Julián Garcés, O.P. (24 Jan 1519 – 13 Oct 1525)

Ordinaries of Diocese of Yucatán

- Francisco del Toral, O.F.M. (19 Nov 1561 – 20 Apr 1571 Died)
- Diego de Landa, O.F.M. (17 Oct 1572 – 29 Apr 1579 Died)
- Gregorio de Montalvo Olivera, O.P. (15 Dec 1580 – 16 Nov 1587 Appointed, Bishop of Cuzco)
- Juan de Izquierdo, O.F.M. (13 Jun 1588 – 17 Nov 1602 Died)
- Diego Vázquez de Mercado (5 Nov 1603 – 28 May 1608 Appointed, Archbishop of Manila)
- Gonzalo de Salazar (bishop), O.S.A. (2 Jun 1608 – 3 Aug 1636 Died)
- Juan Alonso y Ocón (14 Jun 1638 – 31 Aug 1643 Confirmed, Bishop of Cuzco)
- Andrés Fernandez de Ipenza (5 Oct 1643 – 24 Oct 1643 Died)
- Marcos de Torres y Rueda (14 Nov 1644 – 22 Apr 1649 Died)
- Domingo Ramírez de Arellano, O.S.H. (2 Dec 1652 – 2 Jul 1653 Died)
- Lorenzo Horta Rodríguez (29 May 1656 – 13 Aug 1659 Died)
- Luís de Cifuentes y Sotomayor, O.P. (22 Sep 1659 – 18 May 1676 Died)
- Juan de Escalante Turcios y Mendoza (29 Apr 1680 – 31 May 1681 Died)
- Juan Cano Sandoval (7 Dec 1682 – 21 Feb 1695 Died)
- Antonio de Arriaga y Agüero, O.S.A. (20 Nov 1697 Confirmed – )
- Pedro Reyes de los Ríos de Lamadrid, O.S.B. (30 Mar 1700 – 6 Jan 1714 Died)
- Juan Leandro Gómez de Parada Valdez y Mendoza (16 Dec 1715 – 6 Jul 1729 Confirmed, Bishop of Santiago de Guatemala)
- Juan Ignacio de Castorena y Ursúa y Goyeneche (6 Jul 1729 – 13 Jul 1733 Died)
- Francisco Pablo Matos y Coronado (9 Jul 1734 – 2 Jan 1741 Confirmed, Bishop of Michoacán)
- Mateo de Zamora y Penagos, O.F.M. (6 Mar 1741 – 9 Aug 1744 Died)
- José Francisco Martínez de Tejada y Díez de Velasco, O.F.M. (23 Aug 1745 – 20 Dec 1751 Confirmed, Bishop of Guadalajara)
- Juan José de Eguiara y Eguren (24 Jan 1752 – 6 Jul 1752 Resigned)
- Ignacio Padilla Estrada (Guardiola), O.S.A. (28 May 1753 – 20 Jul 1760 Died)
- Antonio Alcalde y Barriga, O.P. (25 Jan 1762 – 27 Jan 1772 Confirmed, Bishop of Guadalajara)
- Diego Bernardo de Peredo y Navarrete (22 Jun 1772 – 14 Dec 1774 Died)
- Juan Manuel Garcia de Vargas y Ribera, O. de M. (3 Apr 1775 Appointed – Did Not Take Effect)
- Antonio Caballero y Góngora (11 Sep 1775 – 14 Dec 1778 Appointed, Archbishop of Santafé en Nueva Granada)
- Luis Tomás Esteban de Piña y Mazo, O.S.B. (12 Jul 1779 – 22 Nov 1795 Died)
- Pedro Agustín Estévez y Ugarte (24 Jul 1797 – 8 May 1827 Died)
- José María Guerra y Rodríguez Correa (17 Dec 1832 – 3 Feb 1863 Died)
- Leandro Rodríguez de la Gala y Enríquez (22 Jun 1868 – 14 Feb 1887 Died)
- Crescencio Carrillo y Ancona (14 Feb 1887 – 19 Mar 1897 Died)
- José Guadalupe de Jesús de Alba y Franco, O.F.M. (28 Dec 1898 – 14 Dec 1899 Appointed, Bishop of Zacatecas)
- Martín Tritschler y Córdoba (30 Aug 1900 – 15 Nov 1942 Died); diocese elevated to archdiocese in 1906

Ordinaries of Archdiocese of Yucatán

- Martín Tritschler y Córdoba, see above
- Fernando Ruiz y Solózarno (22 January 1944 – 15 May 1969)
- Manuel Castro Ruiz (20 September 1969 – 15 March 1995)
- Emilio Carlos Berlie Belaunzarán (15 March 1995 – 1 June 2015)
- Gustavo Rodríguez Vega (1 June 2015 – present); formerly, since 2008, Bishop of Nuevo Laredo

=== Coadjutor bishop ===
- Crescencio Carrillo y Ancona (1884–1887)

=== Auxiliary bishops ===
- Manuel José Pardio Lizama (1840–1861)
- Manuel Castro Ruiz (1965–1969), appointed Archbishop here
- Domingo Jafet Herrera Castillo (1978–1981)
- Ramón Castro Castro (2004–2006), appointed Bishop of Campeche
- José Rafael Palma Capetillo (2004–2016), appointed Auxiliary Bishop of Jalapa (Xalapa), Veracruz
- Fabio Martínez Castilla (2017–

=== Other priests of this diocese who became bishops ===
- Luis Miguel Cantón Marín, appointed Bishop of Tapachula, Chiapas in 1984
- Lázaro Pérez Jiménez, appointed Bishop of Autlán, Jalisco in 1991
- Fabio Martínez Castilla, appointed Bishop of Ciudad Lázaro Cárdenas, Michoacán in 2007
- Jorge Carlos Patrón Wong, appointed Coadjutor Bishop of Papantla, Puebla in 2009

== See also ==
- List of Roman Catholic archdioceses in México
