= Tomás Casillas =

16th-century Roman Catholic bishop

Most Reverend Tomás Casillas
- Bishop of Chiapas
- Church: Catholic Church
- In office: 1552–1567
- Predecessor: Bartolomé de las Casas
- Successor: Pedro Martín Fernández

Orders
- Consecration: 1552 by Francisco Marroquín Hurtado

Personal details
- Born: León, Spain
- Died: 29 October 1567

Tomás Casillas, O.P. (died 1567) was a Roman Catholic prelate who served as Bishop of Chiapas (1552–1567).

== Biography ==
Tomás Casillas was born in León, Spain and ordained a priest in the Order of Friars Preachers. On 19 Jan 1551, he was appointed during the papacy of Pope Julius III as Bishop of Chiapas. In 1552, he was consecrated bishop by Francisco Marroquín Hurtado, Bishop of Santiago de Guatemala In 1555, he attended the First Mexican Provincial Council.

Casillas died on 29 Oct 1567.

== External links and additional sources ==
- Cheney, David M. "Diocese of San Cristóbal de Las Casas". Catholic-Hierarchy.org. (for Chronology of Bishops) ^{[self-published]}
- Chow, Gabriel. "Diocese of San Cristóbal de Las Casas". GCatholic.org. (for Chronology of Bishops) ^{[self-published]}

Catholic Church titles
Preceded by Bartolomé de las Casas	Bishop of Chiapas; 1552–1567	Succeeded by Pedro Martín Fernández
