= Maní, Yucatán =

City in the Mexican state of Yucatán

Maní
- City
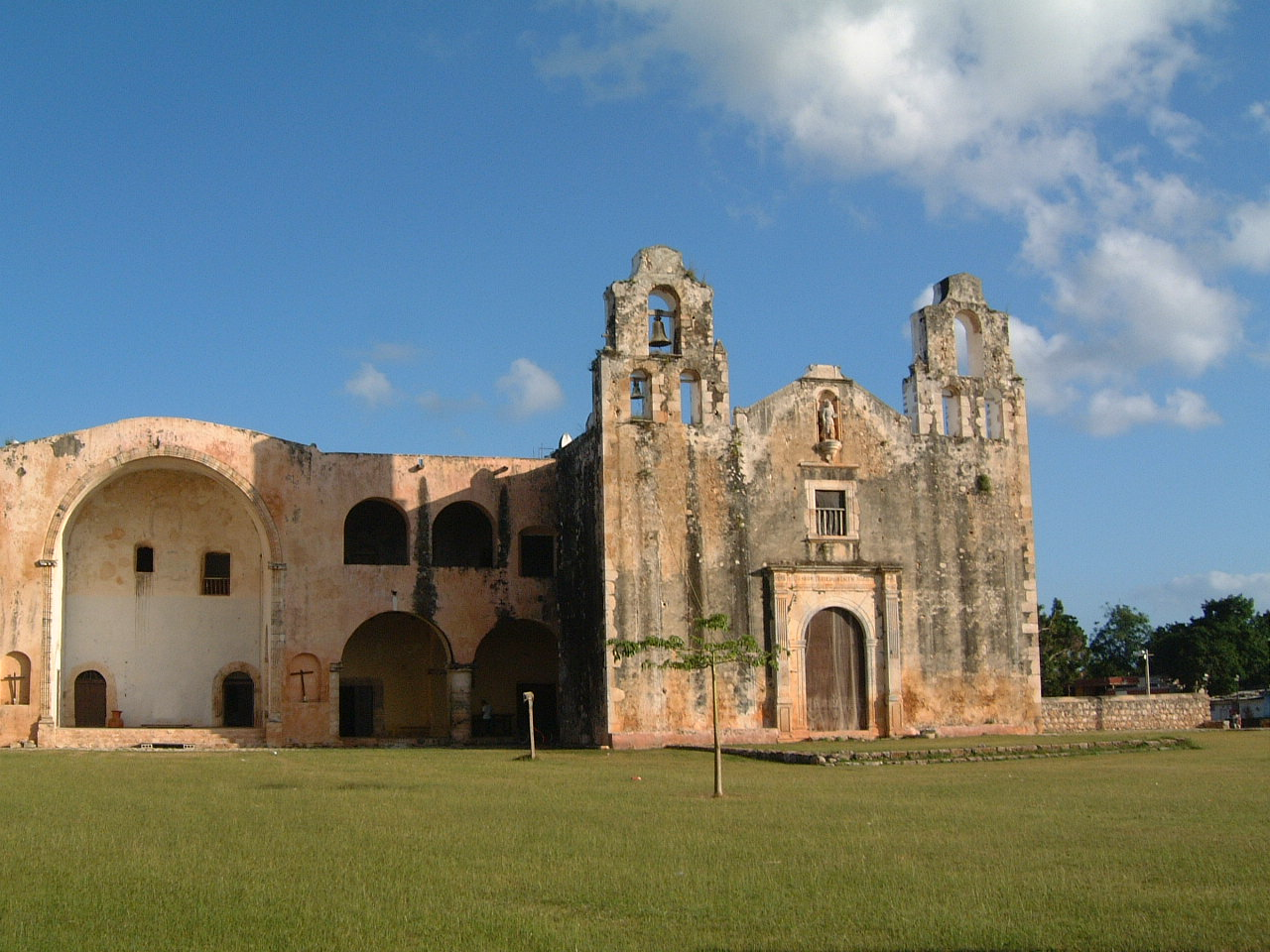
- Church and Convent of San Miguel in Maní

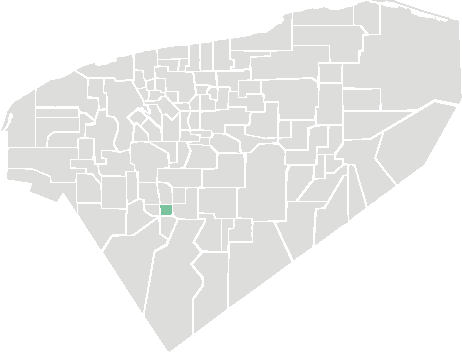
- Location of the municipality of Maní in Yucatán

- The state of Yucatán, México (dark) in the Yucatán Peninsula

- Location within Yucatán (state) Location within Mexico
- Coordinates: 20°23′N 89°24′W
- Country: Mexico
- State: Yucatán
- Municipality: Maní Municipality

Government
  - Municipal President: Santos Román Dzul Beh. 2012–2015
- Elevation: 26 m (85 ft)

Population (2010)
  - Total: 4,146 (Note: The estimated population in the 16th century was 4500. The 2000 population was 4664. The 2005 population was 3915. The recent 2010 population is 4146. A 2014 estimate has 3978.)
- Demonym: Maniense
- Time zone: UTC-6 (Central Standard Time)
- Postal Code: 97850
- Area code: 997
- Website: www.mani.gob.mx

Maní is a small city in Maní Municipality in the central region of the Yucatán Peninsula, in the Mexican state of Yucatán. It is about 100 km to the south south-east of Mérida, Yucatán, some 16 km east of Ticul. The village of Tipikal lies 6 km to the east.

The population is around 4000.

== History ==
Maní's four millennium existence historically involves mostly its early Maya period, followed in recent centuries by its Spanish conquistador and religious period. Its Mexican period beginning over a century ago involved conflict.

=== Early history ===
Maní has been continuously occupied for approximately 4000 years. In the postclassic Mesoamerican era it was home to the Tutul-Xiu Maya dynasty, which moved their capital here from Uxmal in the 13th century. The Xiu were the dominant power in the western Yucatán after the fall of Mayapan in 1441. Maní served as the main religious center in honor of the deity Kukulcan (Cukulcan, Topiltzin Quetzalcoatl) for the Maya with an annual chic kaban festival until 1341.

With the arrival of the Spanish the Xiu of Maní allied themselves with the Spanish and assisted in the conquest of the rest of the peninsula.

=== Maya book burning ===
On 12 July 1562, Friar Diego de Landa, who held the office of inquisitor before the Monastery of San Miguel Arcángel, held an auto de fe Inquisitional ceremony in Maní, burning a number of Maya hieroglyphic books and a reported 5000 idols, saying that they were "works of the devil". The number of books burned is disputed. Landa claimed only burning 27. This act and numerous incidents of torture at the monastery were used to speed the mass adoption of Roman Catholicism throughout the region.

Landa's burning of these sacred books with Mayan writing and the subsequent reaction were described by him as follows:

We found a large number of books in these characters and, as they contained nothing in which were not to be seen as superstition and lies of the devil, we burned them all, which they (the Maya) regretted to an amazing degree, and which caused them much affliction.

=== Guerra de Castas ===
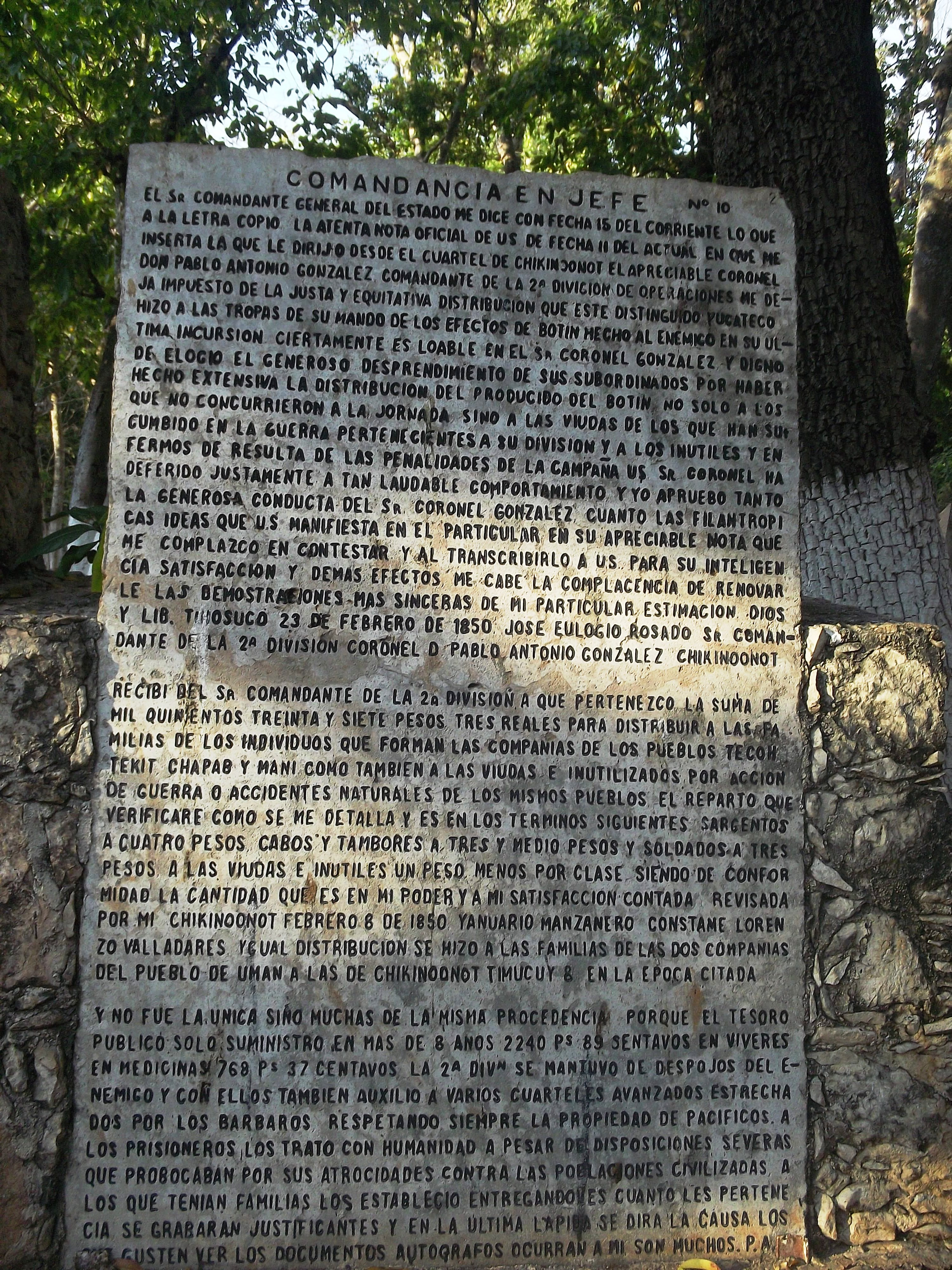
Guerra de Castas stone (one of several) in Mérida, Yucatán noting Maní in 1850 [see 3rd paragraph], Centenario Zoo, Mérida

Maní was involved in part of the multi-decade conflict in the Guerra de Castas, the Caste War of the Yucatán. An engraved stone narrates an episode of the event for Maní in 1850.

== Population ==
Historical population
Year	Pop.	±%
2000BC	initial	—
16th century AD	4,500	—
2000	4,664	+3.6%
2005	3,915	−16.1%
2010	4,146	+5.9%
INEGI: Archivo Histórico de localidades

== Photo gallery ==
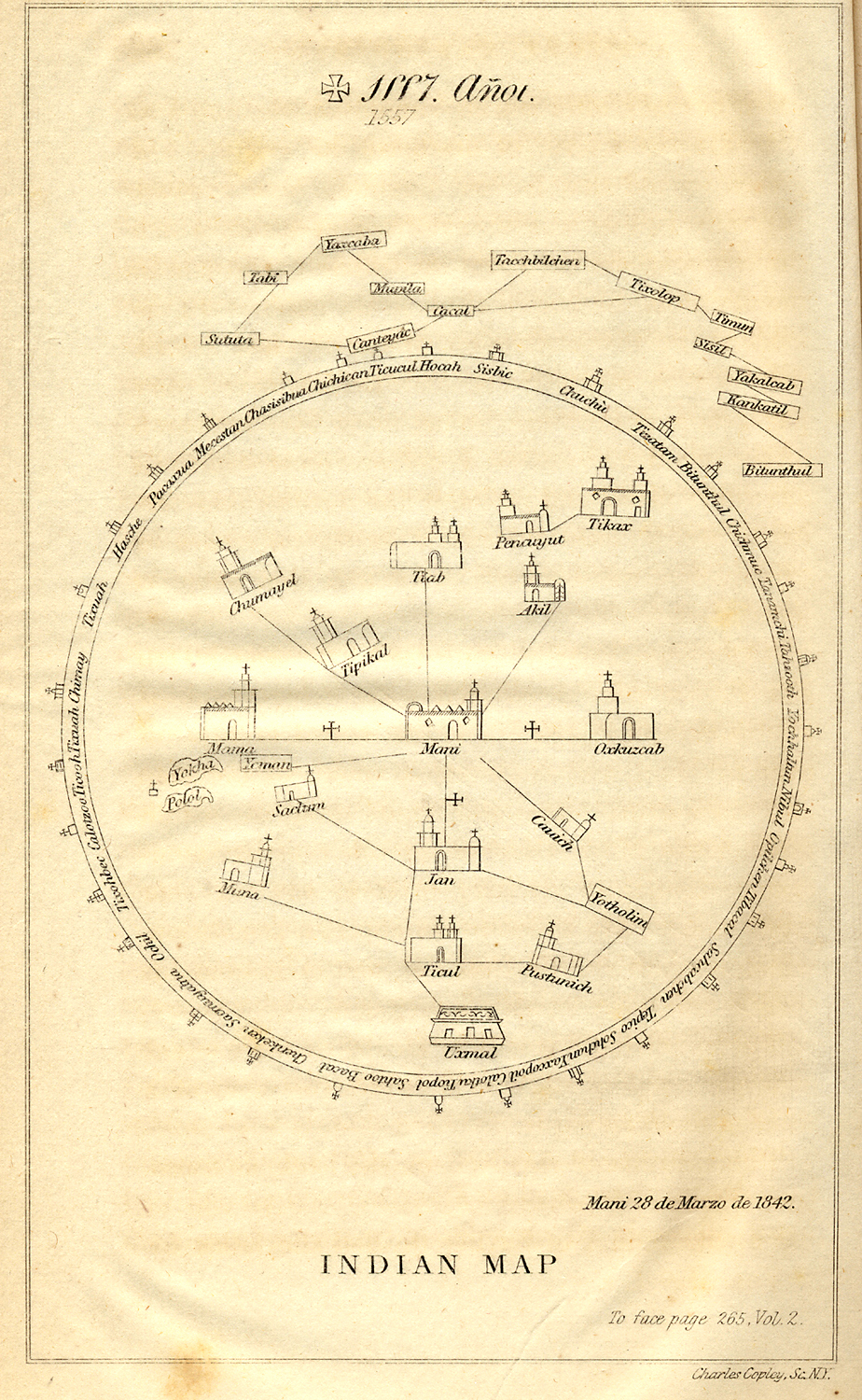
1557 map of a portion of Yucatan centered on the town of Mani. Uxmal is marked by a stylized Maya temple.

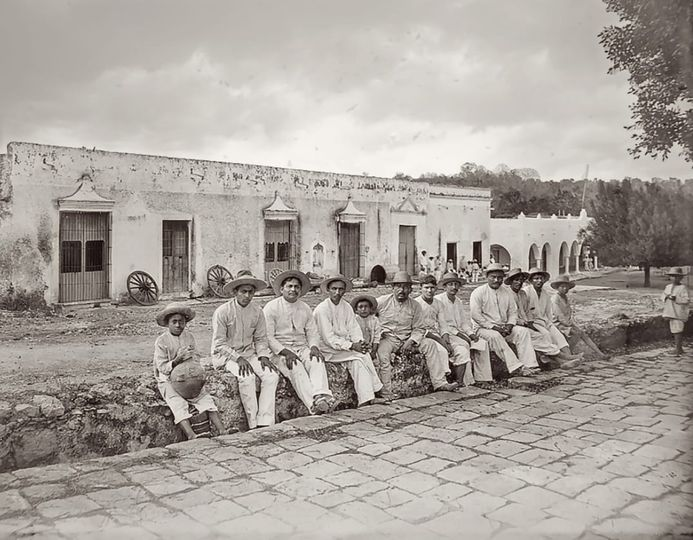
Maní, Yucatán, in 1890

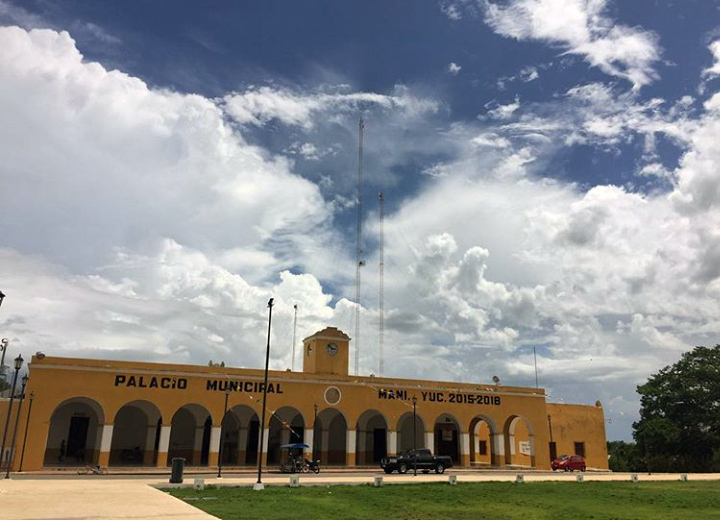
Municipal Palace of Maní, in 2016

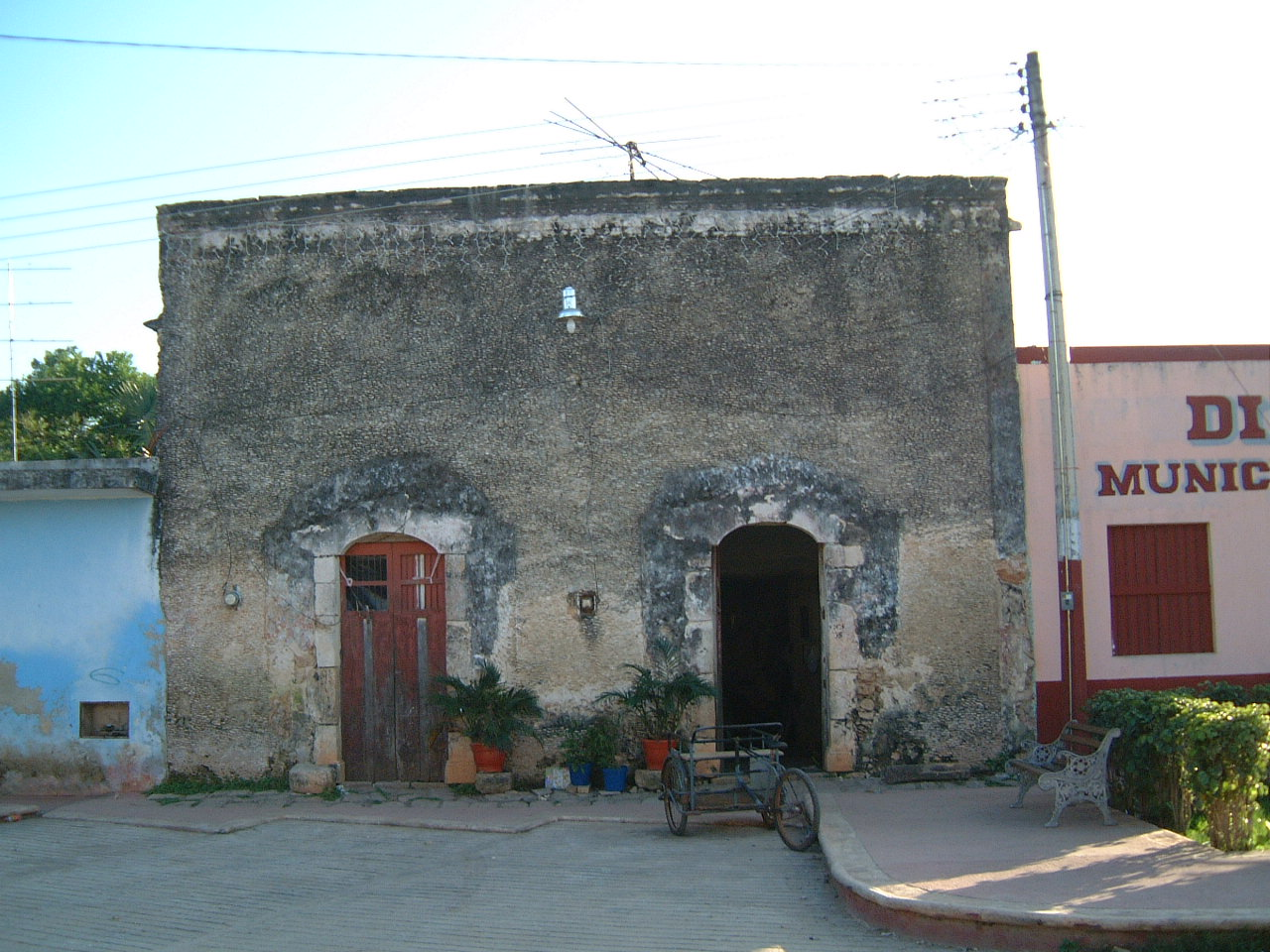
House in the Main Square

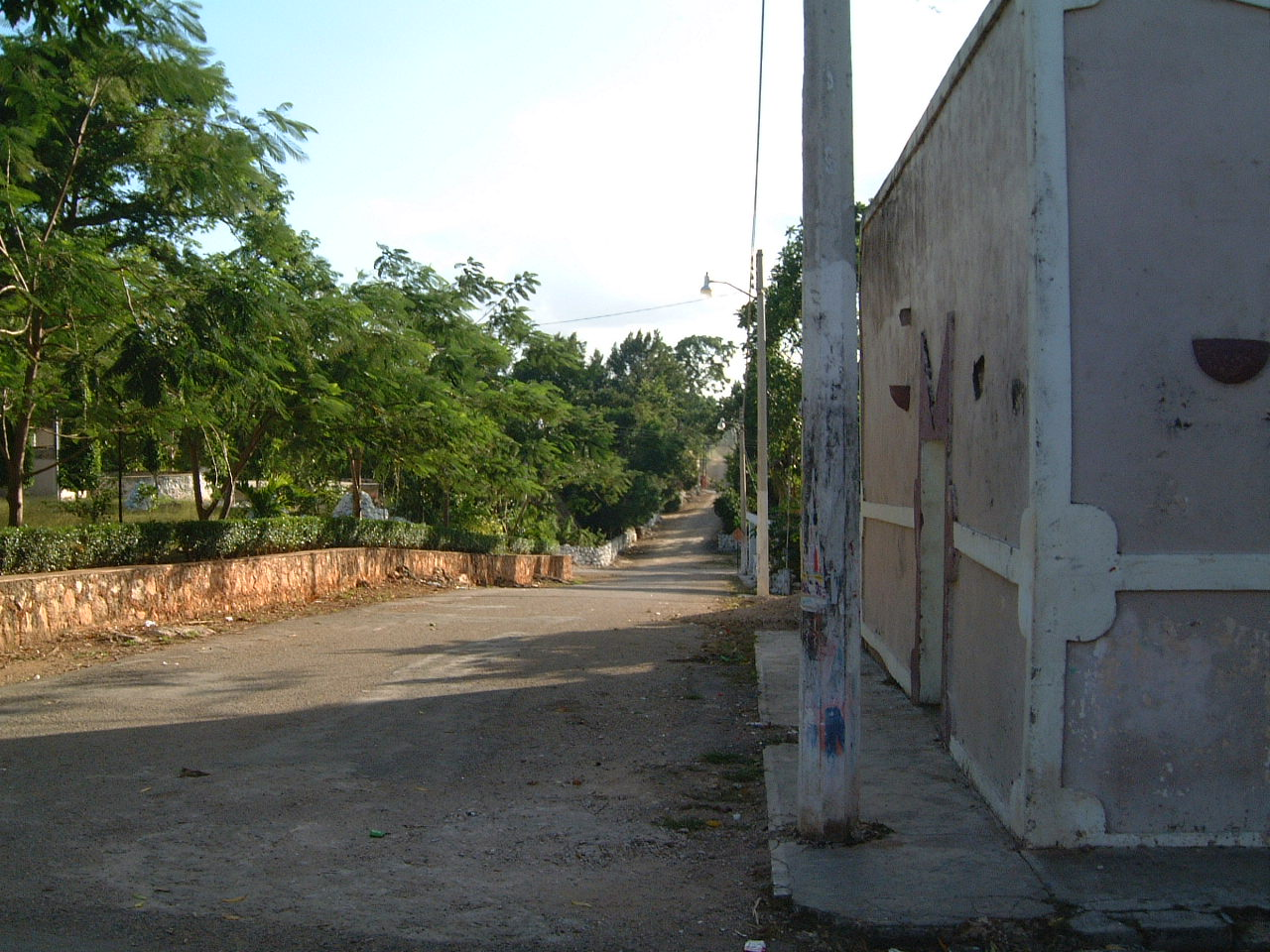
A street

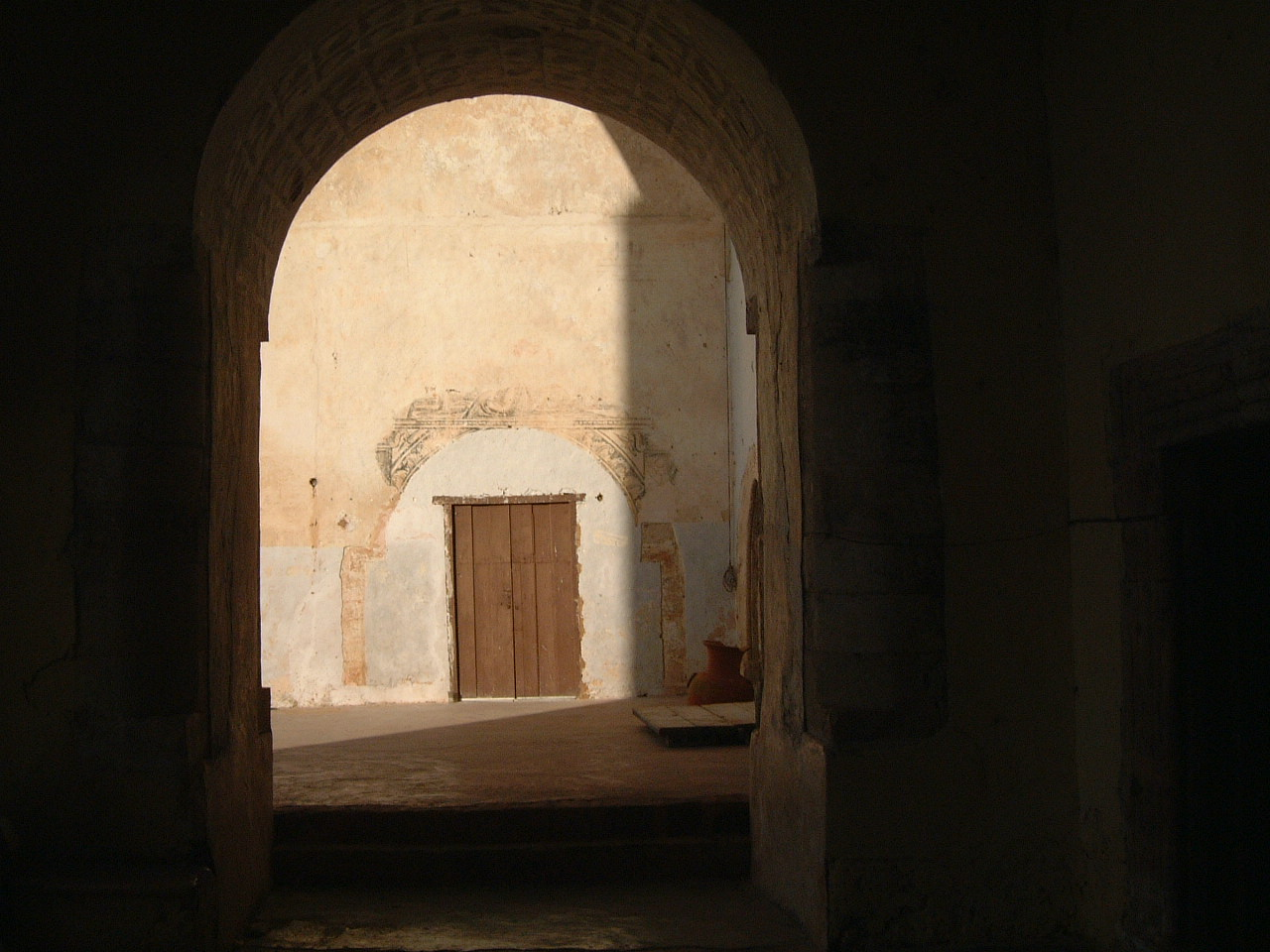
An arch at the Church

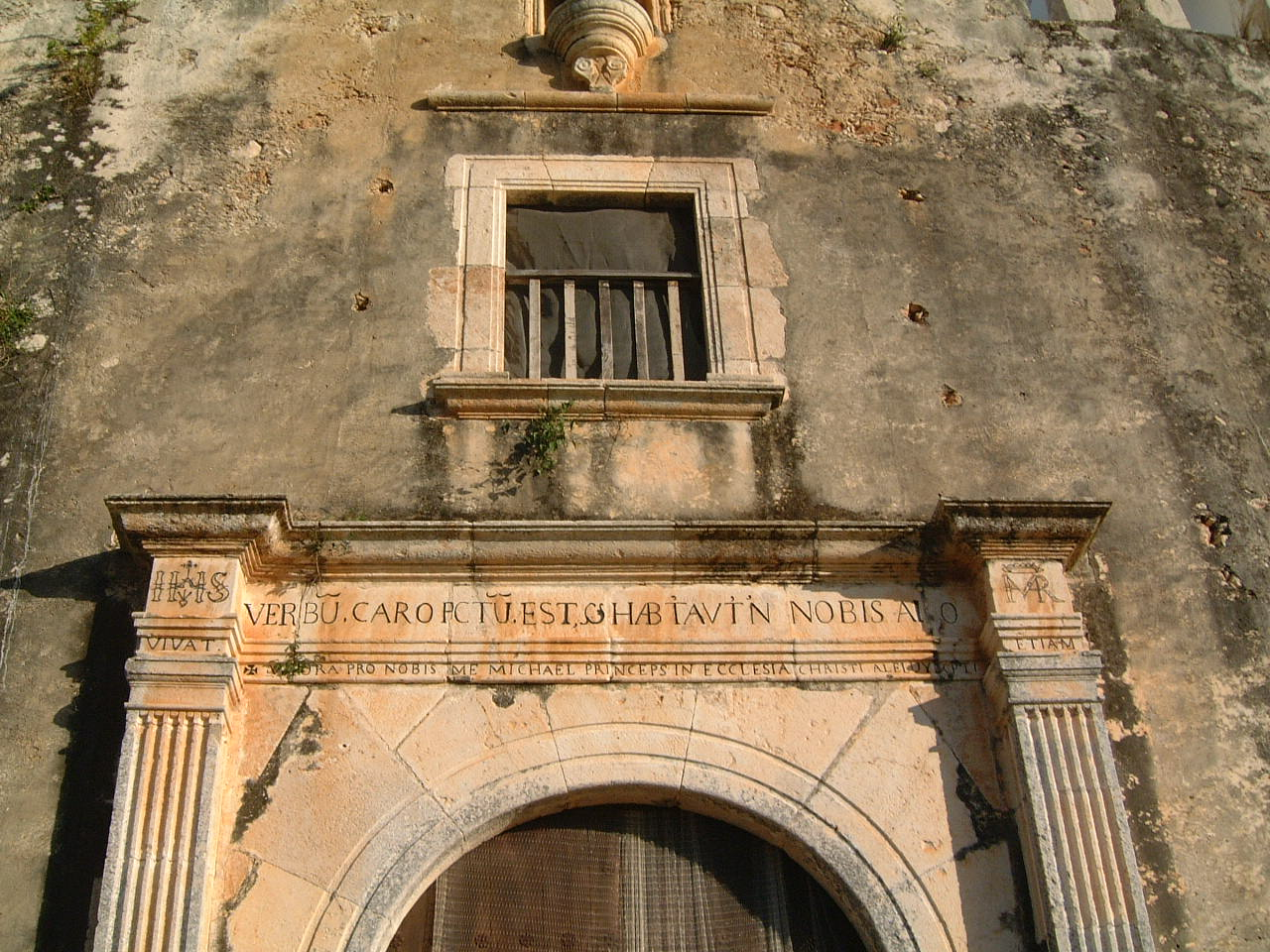
An Inscription at the Church

San Miguel Arcangel, Mani

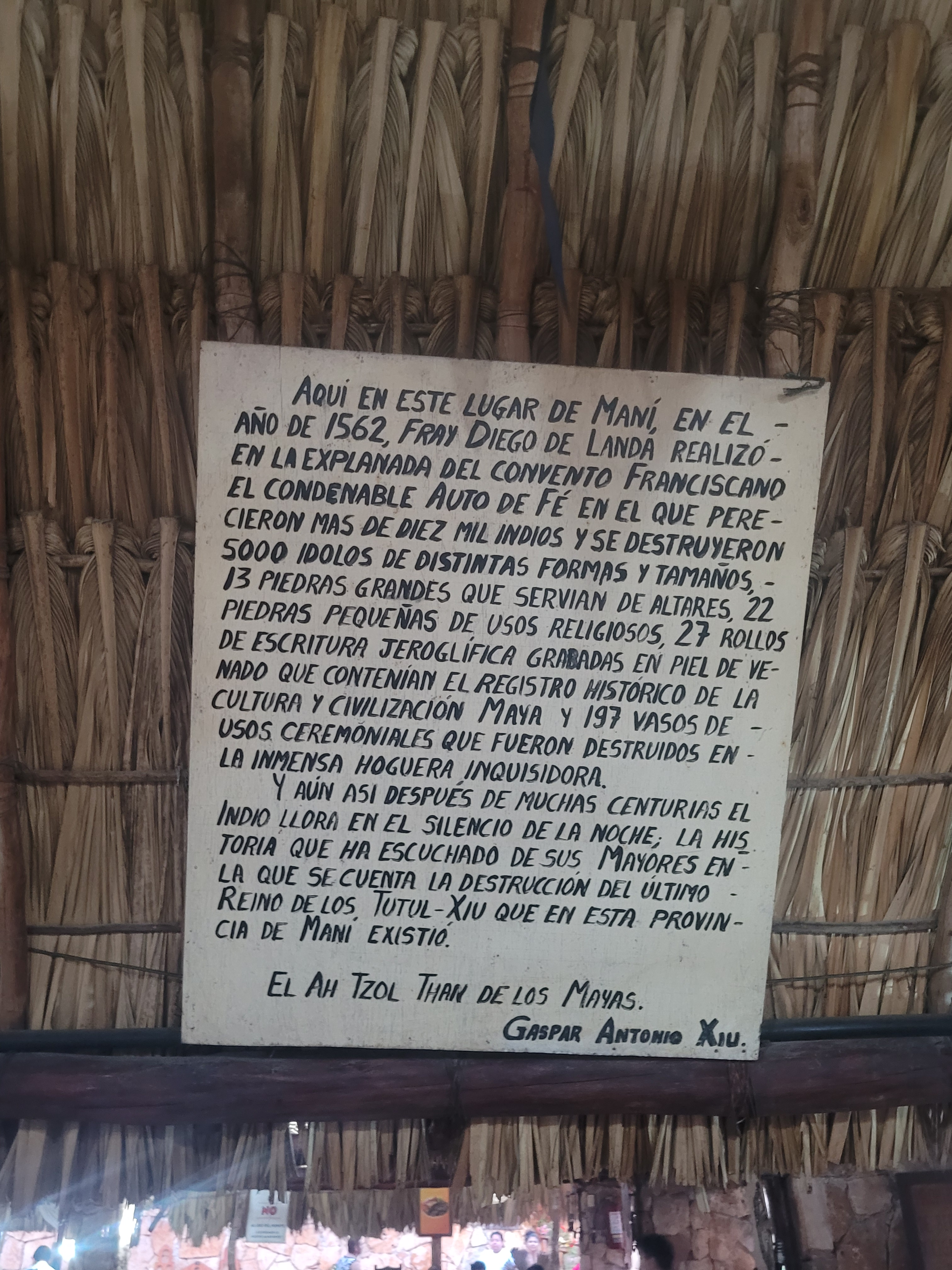
Sign about the burning of Mayan codices in Maní

== See also ==
- List of destroyed libraries
- Cultural genocide
- Cristóbal de Oñate
- Juan de Oñate
