= First Mexican Provincial Council =

Provincial Catholic council of the Mexican Church, 1555

The First Mexican Provincial Council was a 1555 provincial council of the Catholic Church in the Archdiocese of Mexico.

== Attendees ==
Alonso de Montúfar, the archbishop of Mexico, convoked the council on June 29, 1555. The other bishops in attendance were:

- Martín Sarmiento de Osacastro, the bishop of Tlaxcala
- Vasco de Quiroga, the bishop of Michoacán
- Tomás Casillas, the bishop of Chiapas
- Juan López de Zárate, the bishop of Oaxaca

Zárate died during the council.

== Publications ==
The council published a 93-chapter document with its decrees. These rulings touched on a wide variety of topics. The council ordered missionaries to evangelize to Indians in the local language. Seminarians were instructed to own books such as the Summa Sylvestrina, the Summa Caietana, the Summa Angelica, the Manipulus curatorum, and the Summa confessionalis. Natives were banned from becoming priests, and indigenous songs and dances were restricted.
