= Ticul Municipality =

Municipality in the Mexican state of Yucatán

Ticul de Morales
- Municipality
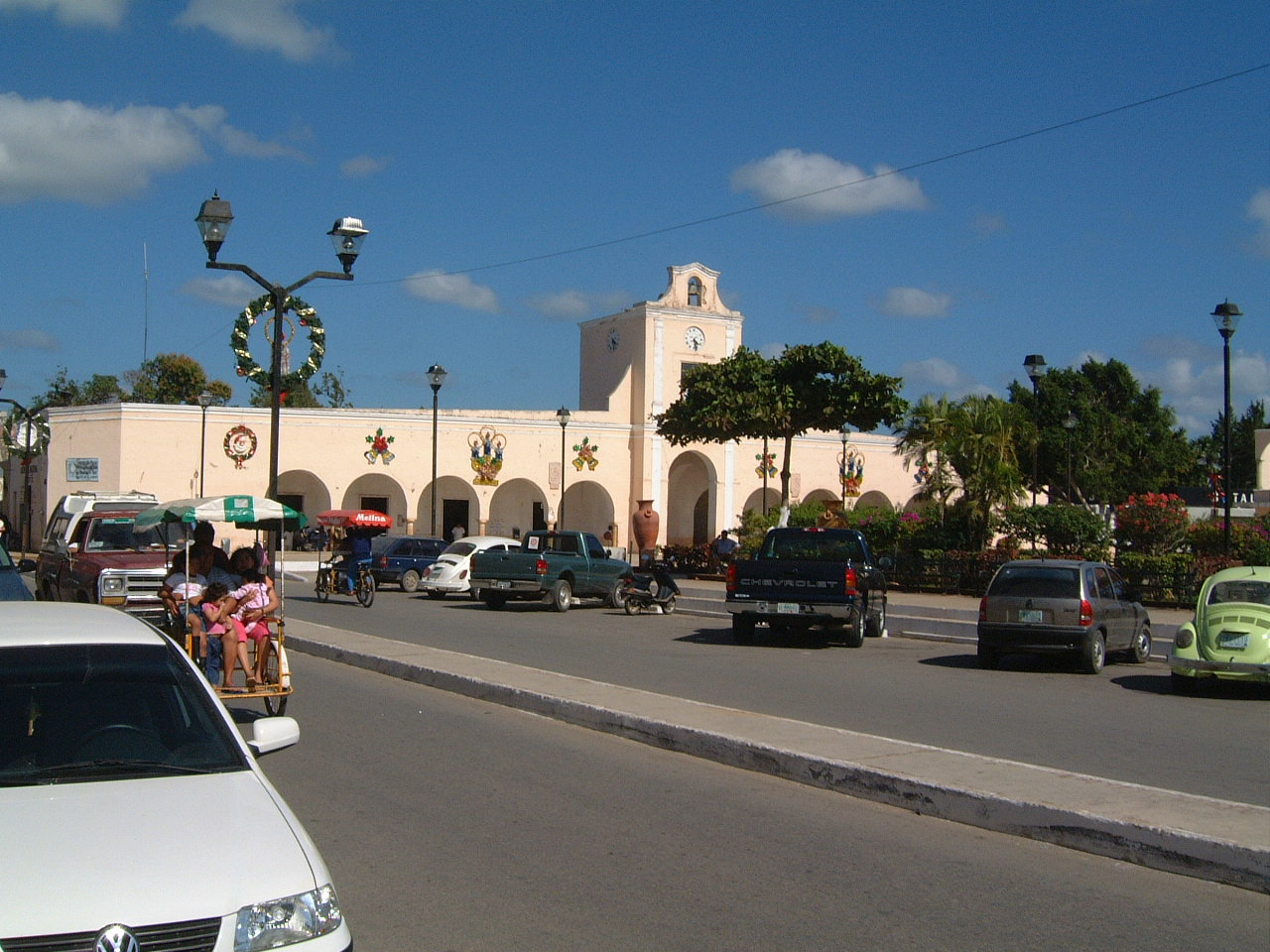
- Ticul City Hall

- Region 7 Sur #089

- Location of the Municipality in Mexico
- Coordinates: 20°24′N 89°32′W
- Country: Mexico
- State: Yucatán

Government
  - Type: PAN 2018–2021
  - Municipal President: Camilo Moises Salomon Lopez

Area
  - Total: 355.12 km^{2} (137.11 sq mi)

Population (2010)
  - Total: 37,685
- Time zone: UTC-6 (Central Standard Time)
- Postal Code: 97860
- Area code: 997
- INEGI Code: 089
- Major Airport: Merida (Manuel Crescencio Rejón) International Airport
- IATA Code: MID
- ICAO Code: MMMD

Ticul de Morales Municipality is a municipality in the Mexican state of Yucatán. It is located in the western part of the state at (20°24′N 89°32′W) 100 km south of the state capital city of Mérida. The municipality, which has an area of 355.12 km^{2} (137.11 sq mi), in the 2005 census reported 25,621 inhabitants. The city of Ticul which is the municipal seat had a population of 21,147, the ninth-largest community in the state in population. The majority are ethnically Maya. Its largest other towns are Pustunich and Yotholín.

== Geography ==
=== Climate ===
Climate data for Ticul
Month	Jan	Feb	Mar	Apr	May	Jun	Jul	Aug	Sep	Oct	Nov	Dec	Year
Mean daily maximum °C (°F)	29.8 (85.6)	31.7 (89.1)	34.1 (93.4)	36.7 (98.1)	37.7 (99.9)	35.7 (96.3)	35.3 (95.5)	35.1 (95.2)	34.3 (93.7)	32.6 (90.7)	31 (88)	29.9 (85.8)	33.7 (92.7)
Mean daily minimum °C (°F)	15 (59)	15.9 (60.6)	17.6 (63.7)	19.4 (66.9)	21.3 (70.3)	21.9 (71.4)	21.2 (70.2)	21.6 (70.9)	21.7 (71.1)	20.6 (69.1)	18.0 (64.4)	16.3 (61.3)	19.2 (66.6)
Average precipitation mm (inches)	20 (0.8)	130 (5)	36 (1.4)	51 (2)	110 (4.5)	170 (6.6)	140 (5.7)	170 (6.5)	190 (7.5)	120 (4.8)	51 (2)	41 (1.6)	1,230 (48.4)
Source: Weatherbase

== Communities ==
The municipality is made up of 32 communities the most important are as follows:

- Ticul (Municipal Seat)
- Pustunich
- Yotholín
- Plan Chac Número Cinco
- Unidades de Riego

== Notable people ==
Francisco Ché Cacique de Ticul who ruled from 1562 to 1569.

== Gallery ==
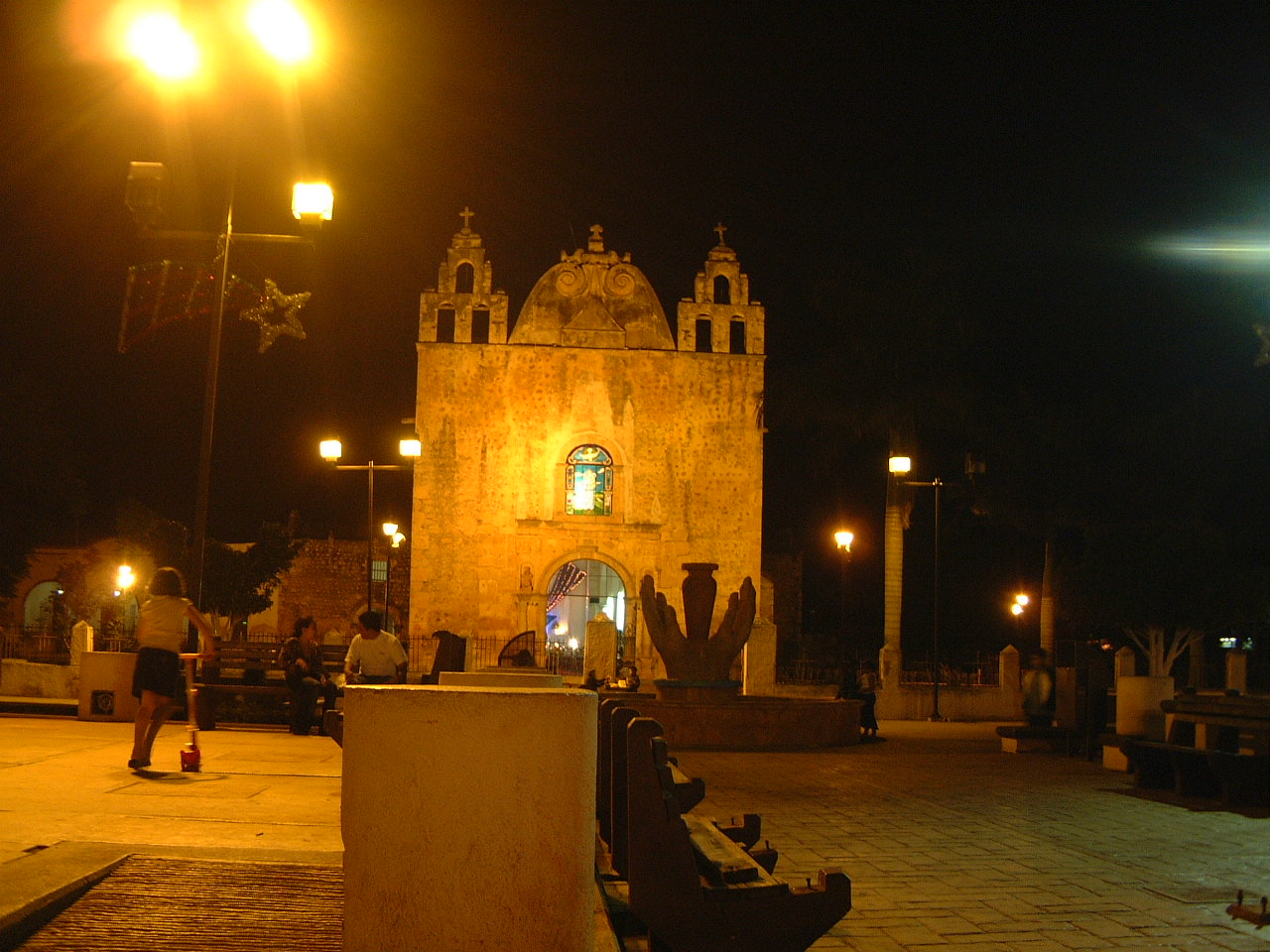
The church at night

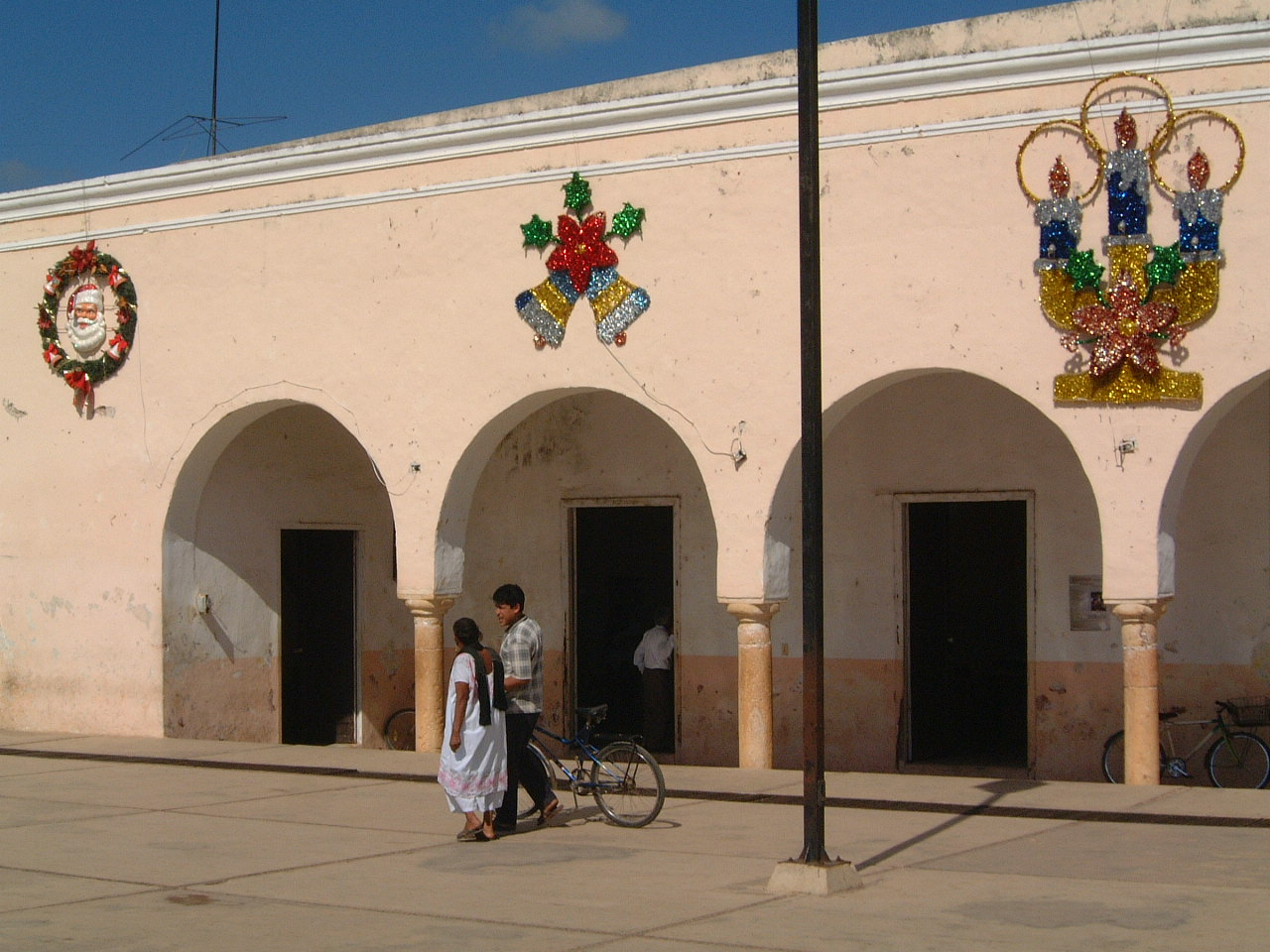
City Hall

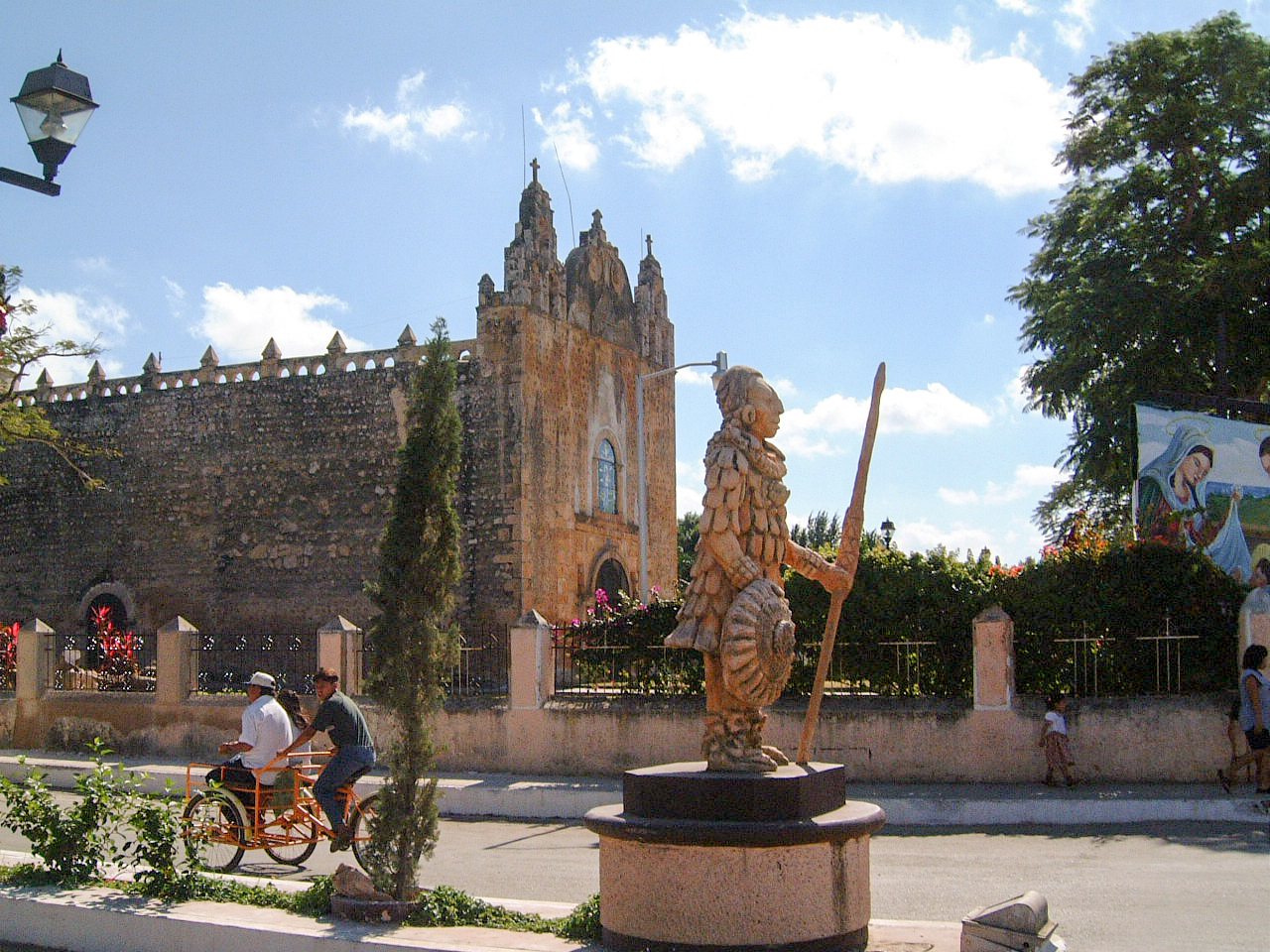
Church
