= Plenary council =

In the Roman Catholic Church, a plenary council is any of various kinds of ecclesiastical synods, used when those summoned represent the whole number of bishops of some given territory. The word itself, derived from the Latin plenarium, meaning "complete" or "full", hence concilium plenarium, also concilium plenum. Plenary councils have a legislative function that does not apply to other national synods.

The ecumenical councils or synods are called plenary councils by Augustine of Hippo, as they form a complete representation of the entire Church. Thus also, in ecclesiastical documents, provincial councils are denominated plenary, because all the bishops of a certain ecclesiastical province were represented. Later usage has restricted the term plenary to those councils which are presided over by a delegate of the Apostolic See, who has received special power for that purpose, and which are attended by all the metropolitans and bishops of some commonwealth, empire, or kingdom, or by their duly accredited representatives. In this article, only those modern provincial councils where the ecclesiastical province covered a whole country or countries (for example, Baltimore for the United States of America or Sydney for Australasia up to the mid-nineteenth century) are discussed, since it is only those that had a de facto plenary effect. Such plenary synods are frequently called national councils.

Plenary councils should be distinguished from:

- plenary assemblies such as those for Canada, India or Poland which are meetings of a number of bishops from some given territory but without the authorisation to be a council;
- the Synod of Bishops in the Catholic Church being a meeting of bishops in the whole church instituted in 1965; and
- Diocesan synods, meetings of church representatives convened by the bishop within one diocese.

== History ==
Plenary councils, in the sense of national synods, are included under the term particular councils as opposed to universal councils. They are of the same nature as provincial councils, with the accidental difference that several ecclesiastical provinces are represented in national or plenary synods. In current canon law they are called by the Episcopal Conference of a given territory when approved by the Pope. The Episcopal Conference itself, a permanent body of bishops from a territory, is a relatively modern structure, with the earliest formed in Switzerland in 1863 and only confirmed as policy at the Second Vatican Council. The ability to meet regularly across large nations or territories waited on modern technology. In contrast, the need to meet for critical matters means that Plenary Councils, called only when necessary to justify the time and effort required, are quite ancient.

=== Ancient ===
Provincial councils, strictly so-called, date from the fourth century, when the metropolitical authority had become fully developed. But synods, approaching nearer to the modern signification of a plenary council, are to be recognized in the synodical assemblies of bishops under primatial, exarchal, or patriarchal authority, recorded from the fourth and fifth centuries, and possibly earlier. Such were, apparently, the synods held in Asia Minor at Iconium and Synnada in the third century, concerning the re-baptism of heretics; such were, certainly, the councils held later in the northern part of Latin Africa, presided over by the Archbishop of Carthage, Primate of Africa. The latter councils were officially designated plenary councils (Concilium Plenarium totius Africae). Their beginnings are without doubt to be referred, at least, to the fourth, and possibly to the third century. Synods of a somewhat similar nature (though approaching nearer to the idea of a general council) were the Council of Arles in Gaul in 314 (at which were present the bishops of London, York, and Caerleon), and the Council of Sardica in 343 (whose canons were frequently cited as Nicene canons). Somewhat later, the Greek Council in Trullo was held in 692.

The popes were accustomed in former ages to hold synods which were designated Councils of the Apostolic See. They might be denominated, to a certain extent, emergency synods, and though they were generally composed of the bishops of Italy, yet bishops of other ecclesiastical provinces took part in them. Pope Martin I held such a council in 649, and Pope Agatho in 680. The patriarchs of Constantinople convoked, on special occasions, a synodos endemousa, at which were present bishops from various provinces of the Greek world who happened to be sojourning in the imperial city, or were summoned to give council to the emperor or the patriarch concerning matters that required special episcopal consultation.

From the end of the sixth century, "national councils" were convoked in the Frankish and West-Gothic kingdoms. The bishops in these synods were not gathered together because they belonged to certain ecclesiastical provinces, but because they were under the same civil government, and consequently had common interests which concerned the kingdom in which they lived or the people over whom they ruled.

=== Early modern ===
==== France ====
As ecclesiastical jurisdiction is necessary for the person who presides over a plenary or national synod, this name has been refused to the assemblies of the bishops of France, which met without papal authorization in the seventeenth and eighteenth centuries. These comitia cleri Gallicani were not really plenary councils. The more noted among them were those held at Paris in 1681 and 1682. Convocations of ecclesiastics (Assemblées du Clergé) were frequent in France before the Revolution of 1789. They consisted of certain bishops deputed by the various ecclesiastical provinces of the kingdom, and of priests elected by their equals from the same provinces, to deliberate on the temporal affairs of the French churches, and more particularly on the assistance, generally monetary, to be accorded to the Government.

After the establishment of the empire, Napoleon I held a great convention of bishops at Paris (1811), and is said to have been much incensed because Pius VII did not designate it a national council. Similarly, mere congresses of bishops, even of a whole nation, who meet to discuss common ecclesiastical affairs, without adhering to synodal forms, are not to be called national or plenary Councils, because no one having the proper jurisdiction has formally summoned them to a canonical synod. Such episcopal conventions have been praised by the Holy See, because they showed unity among the bishops, and zeal for asserting the rights of the Church and the progress of the Catholic cause in their midst, in accordance with the sacred canons, but, as the requisite legal forms and proper hierarchical authority are wanting, these congresses of bishops do not constitute a plenary council, no matter how full the representation of episcopal dignitaries may be. For example, in current usage plenary assemblies though in all other ways identical to plenary councils do not meet those requirements.

==== Mexico ====
- First Mexican Provincial Council
- Second Mexican Provincial Council
- Third Mexican Provincial Council

=== Modern ===
After the nineteenth century, plenary councils became less frequent. For example, the United States held three plenary councils before 1884 and has held none since. From the first few years of the second half of the twentieth century there do not appear to be any plenary councils reported.

The Second Vatican Council noted the historical benefit of "synods, provincial councils and plenary councils", and envisaged that these "venerable institutions" would "flourish with fresh vigor".

Some prominent examples since the second decade of the nineteenth century in order of first plenary council in each territory are:

==== United States of America ====
- Provincial Councils of Baltimore: ten Councils were held between 1829 and 1869. Prior to 1850, all dioceses in the United States were in the ecclesiastical province of Baltimore, so the Provincial Councils covered the whole nation, and were therefore plenary councils de facto. Baltimore was seen as the primal see for the country (cf. Archbishop of Canterbury for England in both the pre-Reformation Catholic Church and the Anglican Church), and the US bishops requested that this be confirmed in 1884, but the Vatican has never done so.
- Plenary Councils of Baltimore (1852, 1866 and 1884) By 1850 a need for the now multiple provinces in the nation to meet was formed, and so three full Plenary Councils across these provinces were held. The attendance at the Provincial Council of Baltimore was significantly lower from 1852 onwards as there were then fewer bishops in the restructured province. The Third Baltimore Council was notable for the Baltimore Catechism, the major catechism in North America from 1884 until the 1960s.

Eight bishops of the United States Conference of Catholic Bishops formally called for a plenary council in 2002, but this did not proceed. There was speculation from US sources that a successful plenary council in Australia would lead other provinces and nations within the Church, such as the US to ask for similar councils.

==== Ireland ====
- (1875) Maynooth. Referred to officially as the Irish Episcopal Plenary Synod of Maynooth (synodi plenariæ Episcoporum hiberniæ). This plenary council had a major influence on the Australasian council which followed it.

==== Australia and New Zealand ====
- As in America, the plenary councils had been preceded by provincial councils with de facto plenary effect, the First and Second Provincial Councils of Australasia in 1844 (Sydney) and 1869 (Melbourne), as before 1874 Australia and New Zealand were one province.
- The plenary councils (1885, 1895 1905 and 1937) are also referred to as the First, Second, Third and Fourth Councils of Sydney, as per American usage with the Plenary Councils of Baltimore. As with Baltimore, Sydney was the de facto Primal see of the country. The first plenary council, like its two provincial predecessors, was a Plenary Council of Australasia (Concilii Plenarii Australasiae), the second and third are Plenary Councils of Australia (Concilii Plenarii Australiensis) and the fourth was again expanded to be the Plenary Council of Australia and New Zealand. The Plenary Councils focused less on doctrine and more on church governance, such as selection procedures for bishops and diocesan boundaries.

Australia was to hold its Fifth Plenary Council in 2020. However, due to the COVID-19 pandemic the Council was delayed to late 2021 and mid-2022. The First Assembly was held from the 3rd to the 10th of October, 2021 in a mixed mode, in-person and online, due to ongoing COVID-19 restrictions. The Second Assembly is to be held in Sydney, NSW in July 2022. Archbishop Phillip Wilson of Adelaide was a proponent of a plenary council for over a decade. In a departure from previous councils, the first session will be held in Adelaide, South Australia, not Sydney. Unlike the Fourth Plenary Council of Sydney, it will not include New Zealand.

==== South America ====
- Latin American Plenary Council (1898).
- Brazilian Plenary Councils (1890 and 1939)

==== East Asia ====
- Chinese plenary council (1924). Plenary Council of Shanghai
- French Indochina plenary council (1934). Plenary Council of Hanoi
- Indian plenary council (1952)
- Philippines plenary council (1953)

== Canon Law ==
=== Authorization ===
A plenary or national council may not be convoked or celebrated without the authority of the Apostolic See, as was solemnly and repeatedly declared by Pope Pius IX. This has always been the practice in the Church, if not explicitly, at least from the fact that recourse could always be had to the Holy See against decisions of such councils. Now, however, express and special papal authorization is required. He who presides over the council must have the necessary jurisdiction, which is accorded by special Apostolic delegation. In the United States, the presidency of such synods has always been accorded by the Holy See to the archbishops of Baltimore. In their case, a papal delegation is necessary, for although they have a precedence of honour over all the other American metropolitans, yet they have no primatial or patriarchal jurisdiction. It is not uncommon for the pope to send from Rome a special delegate to preside over plenary councils.

=== Summons ===
A summons to a national or plenary council is to be sent to all archbishops and bishops of the nation, and they are obliged to appear, unless prevented by a canonical hindrance; to all administrators of dioceses sede plena or vacua, and to vicars capitular sede vacante; to vicars Apostolic possessed of episcopal jurisdiction; to the representatives of cathedral chapters, to abbots having quasi-episcopal jurisdiction. In the United States, custom has sanctioned the summoning of auxiliary, coadjutor, and visiting bishops; provincials of religious orders; all mitred abbots; rectors of major seminaries, as well as priests to serve as theologians and canonists.

=== Attendance ===
Only those who have a right to a summons have also a right to cast a decisive vote in councils. The others may give only a consultive vote. The fathers may, however, empower auxiliary, coadjutor, and visiting bishops, as well as procurators of absent bishops to cast a decisive vote. The Third Plenary Council of Baltimore allowed a decisive vote also to a general of a religious congregation, because this was done at the Vatican Council. At the latter council, however, such vote was granted only to generals of regular orders, but not to those of religious congregations At Baltimore, a decisive vote was refused to abbots of a single monastery, but conferred on arch-abbots.

Those who have a consultive vote and who:

- must attend from the given territory (province, nation or region) include:
  - "the vicars general and episcopal vicars of all the particular churches;
  - "elected representatives of the major superiors of religious institutes and societies of apostolic life;
  - "rectors of ecclesiastical and Catholic universities and deans of faculties of theology and of canon law;
  - "some rectors of major seminaries."
- may attend, include:
  - "presbyters and other members of the Christian faithful who are called to particular councils, but in such a way that their number does not exceed half the number of church officials with a consultive vote attending.
  - "cathedral chapters and the presbyteral council and pastoral council of each particular church who are to be invited to provincial councils so that two of their members represent them.
  - "others who can also be invited as guests to particular councils, by the conference of bishops for a plenary council, or by the metropolitan together with the suffragan bishops for a provincial council."

Critics suggest that the Church does not communicate well the true limited role of lay participants in Plenary Councils, and that this may create unrealised expectations from the misapplication of the lay understanding of participation. This view is that the Church needs to find ways to make this consultative role of the laity more real.

== Process ==
=== Discussion ===
In particular councils, the subject-matter to be treated is what concerns discipline, the reformation of abuses, the repression of crimes, and the progress of the Catholic cause. In former times, such councils often condemned incipient heresies and opinions contrary to sound morals, but their decisions became dogmatic only after solemn confirmation by the Apostolic See. Thus, the Council of Milevum (416) and Council of Carthage (418) condemned Pelagianism, and the Council of Orange (Arausicanum) Semipelagianism.

Such latitude is not allowed to modern synods, and the Fathers are warned that they are not to restrict opinions which are tolerated by the Catholic Church.

=== Decrees ===
One of the most important powers of the plenary council is its legislative function. Decrees of plenary councils must be submitted, before promulgation, for the confirmation, recognition and revision of the Holy See. Such recognition does not imply an approval of all the regulations submitted by the council.

Bishops have the power of relaxing decrees of a plenary council in particular cases in their own dioceses, unless the council was confirmed in forma specifica at Rome. In like manner, when no specific confirmation of the decrees has been accorded, it is lawful to appeal from these councils. In modern times, it is not unusual for the Holy See to confirm councils in forma specifica, but only to accord them the necessary recognition. If, consequently, anything be found in their acts contrary to the common law of the Church, it would have no binding force unless a special apostolic derogation were made in its favour.

== Prospects ==
In both the recent US and Australian cases above, the main driver for seeking a plenary council was to deal with the issues surrounding Catholic Church sexual abuse cases, although the Fifth Australian Plenary Council was to deal with a wider range of issues. Archbishop Phillip Wilson of Adelaide gave evidence before the Royal Commission into Institutional Responses to Child Sexual Abuse that the plenary council was the appropriate church forum to respond to the child sexual abuse issue, rather than national or diocesan synods because:

In the system, the really important gathering for the local Church is called the plenary council. The plenary council involves not just the bishops, although they are part of it, but it involves an engagement with other clergy and laypeople and it has to have a program of consultation to prepare for its action. The plenary council has the ability to make regulations and rules, so it has a legislative power, which makes it a very important part of the way in which the life of the Church operates.

— Phillip Wilson

However, because this issue is significant in many other territories, there is potential for the further revival of this long neglected form of governance through plenary councils in other jurisdictions if it is seen as being effective.

== See also ==
- Plenary Councils of Baltimore
