= Ticul =

City in the Mexican state of Yucatán

- Municipal seat
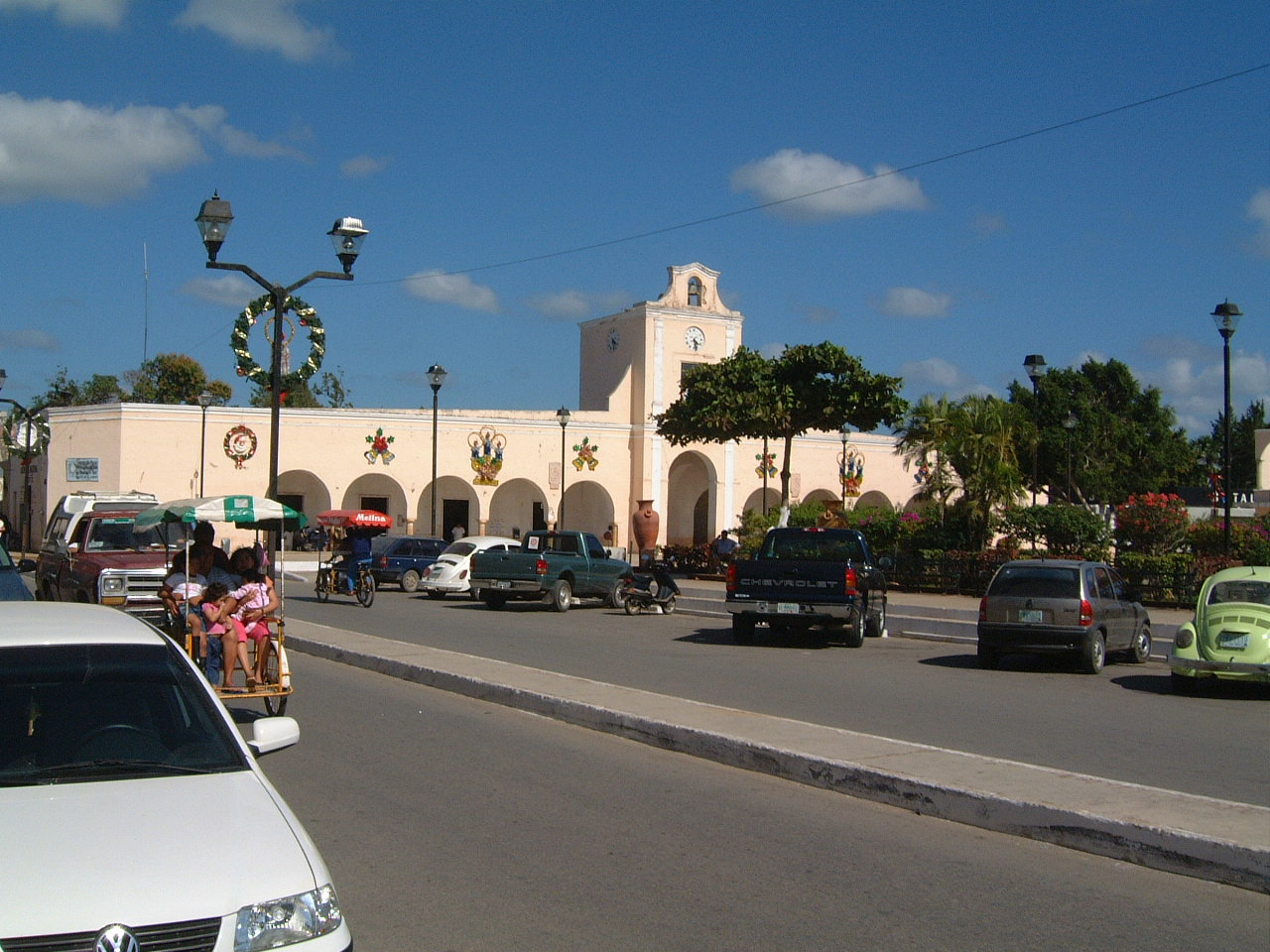
- Ticul main square and city hall

- Location within Yucatán (state)
- Coordinates: 20°23′43″N 89°32′2″W
- Country: Mexico
- State: Yucatán
- Municipality: Ticul

Population (2010)
  - Total: 32,796

Ticul is a city in the Mexican state of Yucatán. It serves as the municipal seat of the surrounding municipality of the same name and is located some 100 km south of the state capital, Mérida. In 2000 Ticul had a population of about 28,000 people. The majority are ethnically Maya.

Ticul was a town of the Pre-Columbian Maya civilization. It has been continuously occupied since at least the 7th century BC. After the Spanish conquest of Yucatán Ticul was reestablished as a Spanish colonial town in 1549. The Republic of Yucatán granted Ticul the status of a city in 1847.

The city is nicknamed La Perla del Sur ("The Pearl of the South"), as it is in the southern part of the state of Yucatán.

Ticul has long been known for the red pottery produced there. Over half the population still speaks the Maya language as their first tongue, although Spanish is also understood. The pork dish poc-chuc is a well known local specialty.
