= History of the Catholic Church in Mexico =

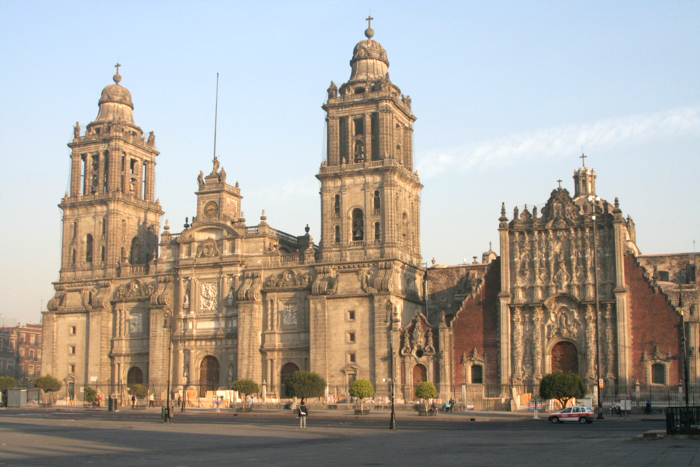
The Mexico City Metropolitan Cathedral.

The history of the Catholic Church in Mexico dates from the period of the Spanish conquest (1519–21) and has continued as an institution in Mexico into the twenty-first century. Catholicism is one of many major legacies from the Spanish colonial era, the others include Spanish as the nation's language, the Civil Code and Spanish colonial architecture. The Catholic Church was a privileged institution until the mid nineteenth century. It was the sole permissible church in the colonial era and into the early Mexican Republic, following independence in 1821. Following independence, it involved itself directly in politics, including in matters that did not specifically involve the Church.

In the mid-nineteenth century the liberal Reform brought major changes in church-state relations. Mexican liberals in power challenged the Catholic Church's role, particularly in reaction to its involvement in politics. The Reform curtailed the Church's role in education, property ownership, and control of birth, marriage, and death records, with specific anticlerical laws. Many of these were incorporated into the Constitution of 1857, restricting the Church's corporate ownership of property and other limitations. Although there were some liberal clerics who advocated reform, such as José María Luis Mora, the Church came to be seen as conservative and anti-revolutionary. During the bloody War of the Reform, the Church was an ally of conservative forces that attempted to oust the liberal government. They also were associated with the conservatives' attempt to regain power during the Second French intervention in Mexico, when Maximilian of Habsburg was invited to become emperor of Mexico. The empire fell and conservatives were discredited, along with the Catholic Church. However, during the long presidency of Porfirio Díaz (1876–1911) the liberal general pursued a policy of conciliation with the Catholic Church; though he kept the anticlerical articles of the liberal constitution in force, he in practice allowed greater freedom of action for the Catholic Church. With Díaz's ouster in 1911 and the decade-long conflict of the Mexican Revolution, the victorious Constitutionalist faction led by Venustiano Carranza wrote the new Constitution of 1917 that strengthened the anticlerical measures in the liberal Constitution of 1857.

With the presidency of Northern, anticlerical, revolutionary general Plutarco Elías Calles (1924–28), the State's enforcement of the anticlerical articles of Constitution of 1917 provoked a major crisis with violence in a number of regions of Mexico. The Cristero War (1926–29) was resolved, with the aid of diplomacy of the U.S. Ambassador to Mexico, ending the violence, but the anticlerical articles of the constitution remained. President Manuel Ávila Camacho (1940–1946) came to office declaring "I am a [Catholic] believer," (soy creyente) and Church-State relations improved though without constitutional changes.

A major change came in 1992, with the presidency of Carlos Salinas de Gortari (1988–1994). In a sweeping program of reform to "modernize Mexico" that he outlined in his 1988 inaugural address, his government pushed through revisions in the Mexican Constitution, explicitly including a new legal framework that restored the Catholic Church's juridical personality. The majority of Mexicans in the twenty-first century identify themselves as being Catholic, but the growth of other religious groups such as Protestant evangelicals, Mormons, as well as secularism is consistent with trends elsewhere in Latin America. The 1992 federal Act on Religious Associations and Public Worship (Ley de Asociaciones Religiosas y Culto Público), known in English as the Religious Associations Act or (RAA), has affected all religious groups in Mexico.

== Early period: The Spiritual Conquest 1519–1572 ==
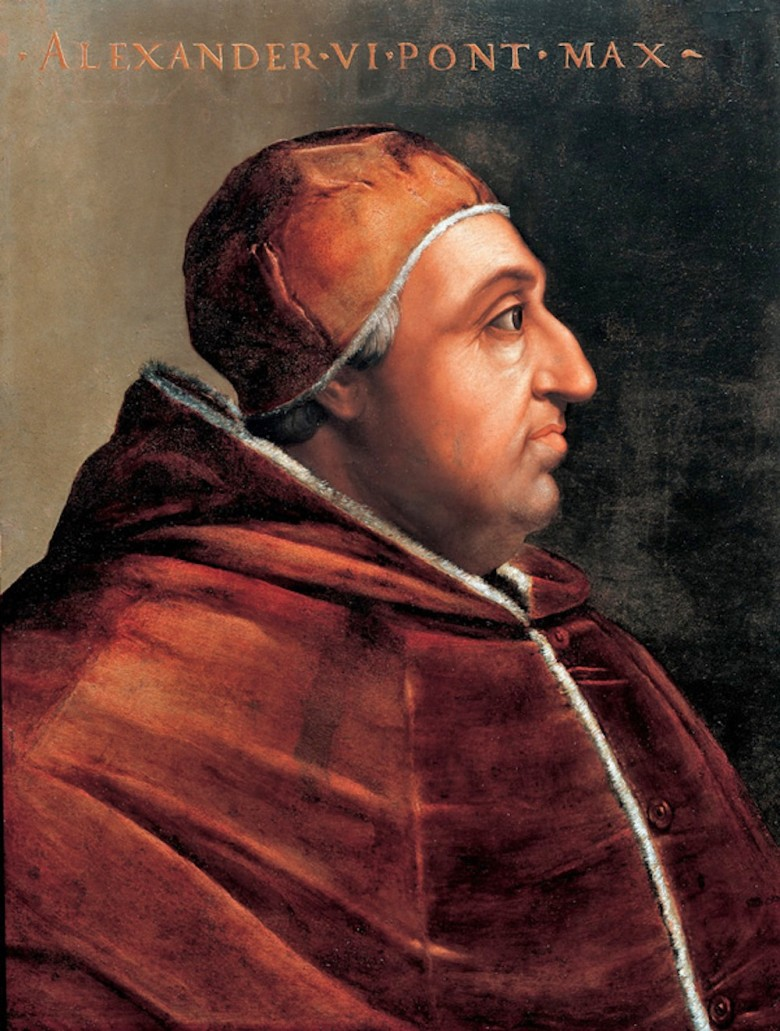
Pope Alexander VI, who granted the Spanish crown extensive powers.

During the conquest, the Spaniards pursued a dual policy of military conquest, bringing indigenous peoples and territory under Spanish control, and spiritual conquest, that is, conversion of indigenous peoples to Christianity. When Spaniards embarked on the exploration and conquest of Mexico, a Catholic priest, Gerónimo de Aguilar, accompanied Hernán Cortés's expedition. Spaniards were appalled at the ritual practice of human sacrifice and initially attempted to suppress it, but until the Spanish conquest of the Aztec Empire was accomplished, it was not stamped out. The rulers of Cortés's allies from the city-state of Tlaxcala converted to Christianity almost immediately and there is a depiction of Cortés, Malinche, and the lords of Tlaxcala showing this event. But not until the fall of the Aztec capital of Tenochtitlan in 1521 was a full-scale conversion of the indigenous populations undertaken.

=== Power of the Spanish Crown in ecclesiastical matters ===
The justification of Spanish (and Portuguese) overseas conquests was to convert the existing populations to Christianity. The pope granted the Spanish monarch (and the crown of Portugal) broad concessions termed the Patronato Real or Royal Patronage, giving the monarch the power to appoint candidates for high ecclesiastical posts, collection of tithes and support of the clergy, but did not cede power in matters of doctrine or dogma. This essentially made the Spanish monarch the highest power of Church and State in its overseas territories.

=== The first evangelists to the indigenous ===
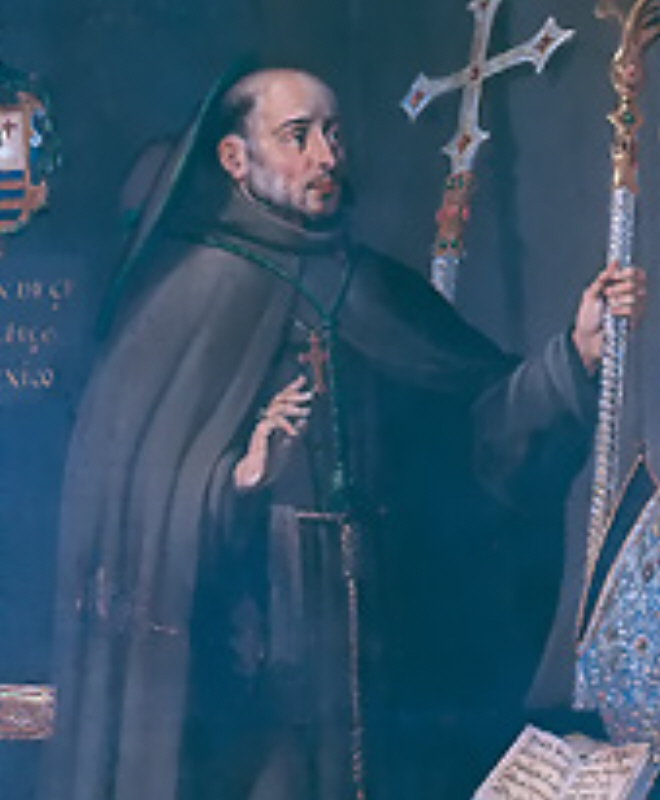
Juan de Zumárraga, the first bishop of Mexico.

In the early conquest era of Mexico, the formal institutions of Church and State had not been established. But to initiate the spiritual conquest even though the episcopal hierarchy (the diocesan clergy) had not yet been established, Cortés requested that the mendicant orders of Franciscans, Dominicans, and Augustinians be sent to New Spain, to convert the indigenous. The Twelve Apostles of Mexico as they are known were the first Franciscans who arrived in 1524, followed by the Dominican order in 1526, and the Augustinian order in 1533.

Mendicants did not usually function as parish priests, administering the sacraments, but mendicants in early Mexico were given special dispensation to fulfill this function. The Franciscans, the first-arriving mendicants, staked out the densest and most central communities as their bases for conversion. These bases (called doctrina) saw the establishment of resident friars and the building of churches, often on the same sacred ground as pagan temples.

Given the small number of mendicants and the vast number of indigenous to convert, outlying populations of indigenous communities did not have resident priests but priests visited at intervals to perform the sacraments (mainly baptism, confession, and matrimony). In prehispanic Central Mexico, there had been a long tradition of conquered city-states adding the gods of their conquerors to their existing pantheon so that conversion to Christianity seemed to be similar.

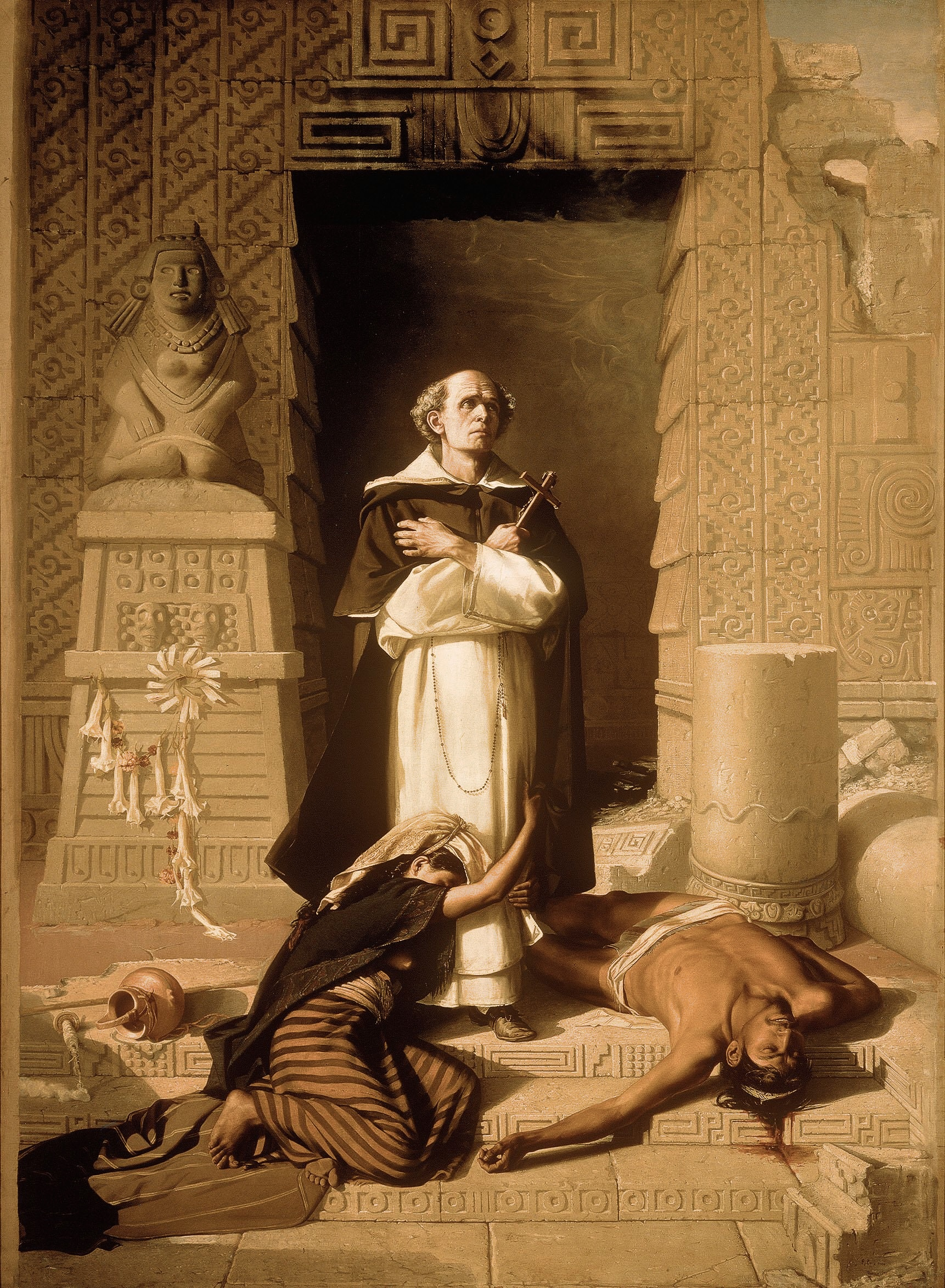
Fray Bartolomé de las Casas depicted as Savior of the Native Americans in a later painting by Felix Parra

In Texcoco, however, a member of the native nobility, Don Carlos, was accused and convicted of sedition by the apostolic inquisition (which gives inquisitorial powers to a bishop) headed by Juan de Zumárraga in 1536 and was executed. His execution prompted the crown to reprimand Zumárraga and when the Holy Office of the Inquisition was established in Mexico in 1571, Indians were exempted from its jurisdiction. There was a concern that Indians were insufficiently indoctrinated in Catholic orthodox beliefs to be held to the same standards as Spaniards and other members of the República de Españoles. In the eyes of the Church and in Spanish law, Indians were legal minors.

Despite the fall of the Aztec Empire in 1521 at the hand of Hernán Cortés, it is arguable that Catholic conversion of the Indigenous peoples of Mexico didn’t truly begin until the arrival of the Twelve Apostles, a group of twelve Franciscan friars, in 1524. It has long been believed that the Indigenous of Mexico were passive in the conversion, with the majority simply accepting the new religion, thanks in part to the claims of the friars that the people were eager and devout converts from the beginning, though by the 1990s, historians began to wonder if that were really the case. Two concerns arise when considering how receptive the indigenous were to Catholicism. One crucial example being the Devil, for which there was no such person in Aztec belief, meaning there was already a huge disconnect when it came to vital understandings of Catholicism and the way in which it functions. Fray Toribio de Benavente Motolinia himself, wrote "And with this, each of the friars would speak as much and as best as they could about what would be best for the salvation of the Indians, but to them, it was a grand annoyance hearing the word of God and they did not want to understand anything but giving themselves to vices and sins ..." which implies that there was some difficulty in translation due to the fact that the Indigenous supposedly couldn’t understand anything the friars were teaching, and that some Indigenous didn’t care or got frustrated with the preaching of the friars thanks to the description of them being annoying, giving us a clearer image of how the Nahua truly felt about this new religion. The second would be that some Indigenous people of Mexico who welcomed this new god brought by the Spanish, did not exclusively believe in him, particularly those who were older, instead opting to add Jesus to their Pantheon, which led to the friars opting to focus on the more malleable younger generation.

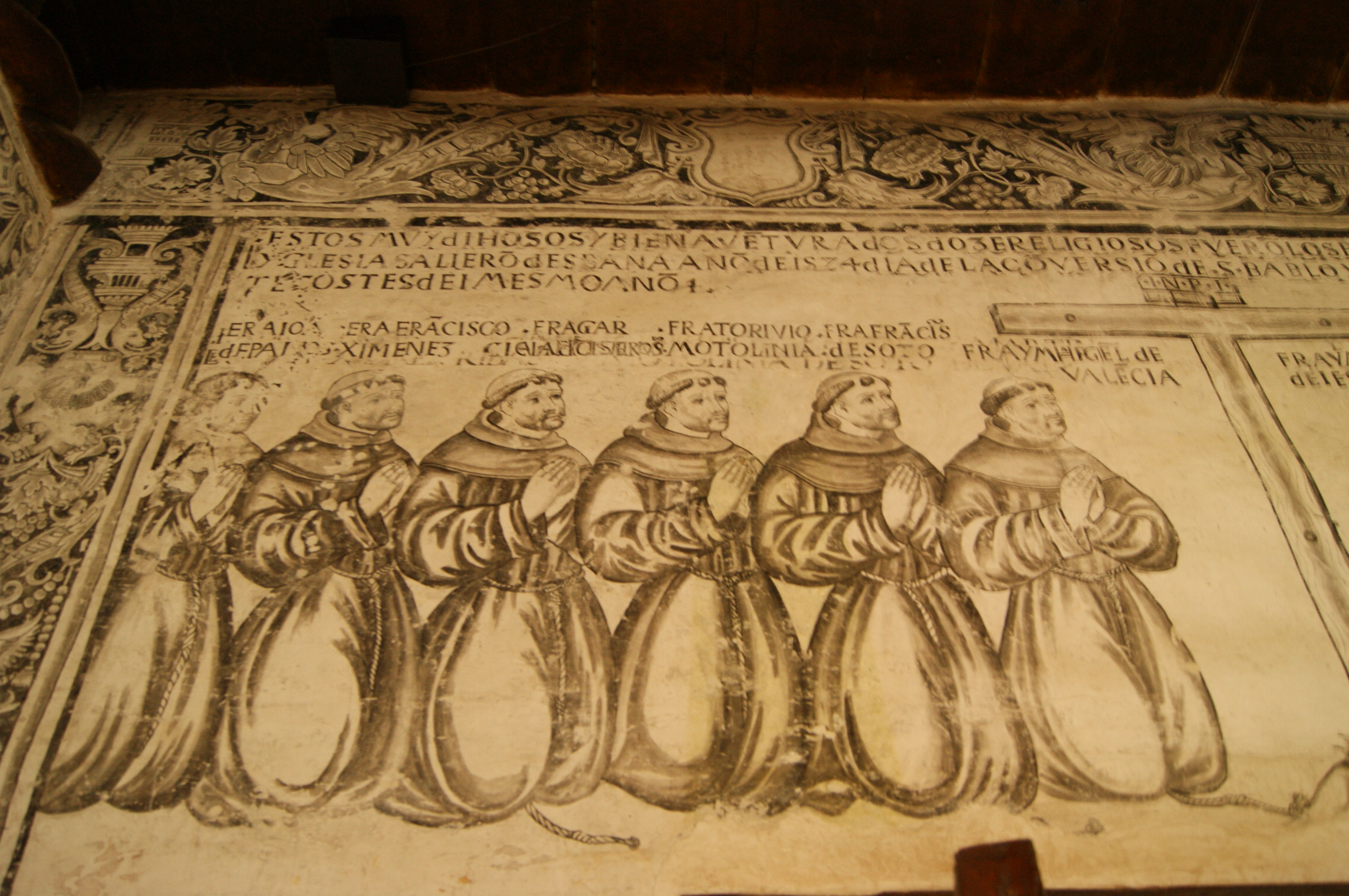
Indigenous mural painting in the Exconvento de Huejotzingo (former Convent Huejotzingo) which represents six of the twelve first Franciscan missionaries to New Spain.

The arrival of the Franciscan Twelve Apostles of Mexico initiated what came to be called The Spiritual Conquest of Mexico. Many of the names and accomplishments of earliest Franciscans have come down to the modern era, including Toribio de Benavente Motolinia, Bernardino de Sahagún, Andrés de Olmos, Alonso de Molina, and Gerónimo de Mendieta. The first bishop of Mexico was Franciscan Juan de Zumárraga. Early Dominicans in Mexico include Bartolomé de Las Casas, who famously was an encomendero and black slave dealer in the early Caribbean before he became a Dominican friar; Diego Durán and Alonso de Montúfar who became the second bishop of Mexico. It was not until Pedro Moya de Contreras became archbishop of Mexico in 1573 that a diocesan cleric rather than a mendicant served as Mexico's highest prelate.

The friars sought ways to make their task of converting millions of Indians less daunting. By using existing indigenous settlements in Central Mexico where indigenous rulers were kept in place in the post-conquest period, the mendicant orders created doctrinas, major Indian towns designated as important for the initial evangelization, while smaller settlements, visitas, were visited at intervals to teach, preach, and administer the sacraments.

Friars built churches on the sites of temples, transforming the ancient sacred space into a place for Catholic worship. Some of these have been recognized by UNESCO as World Heritage Sites under the general listing of Monasteries on the slopes of Popocatépetl. Churches were built in the major Indian towns and, by the late sixteenth century, local neighborhoods; barrios (Spanish) or tlaxilacalli (Nahuatl) built chapels.

=== The abandoned experiment to train Indian priests ===
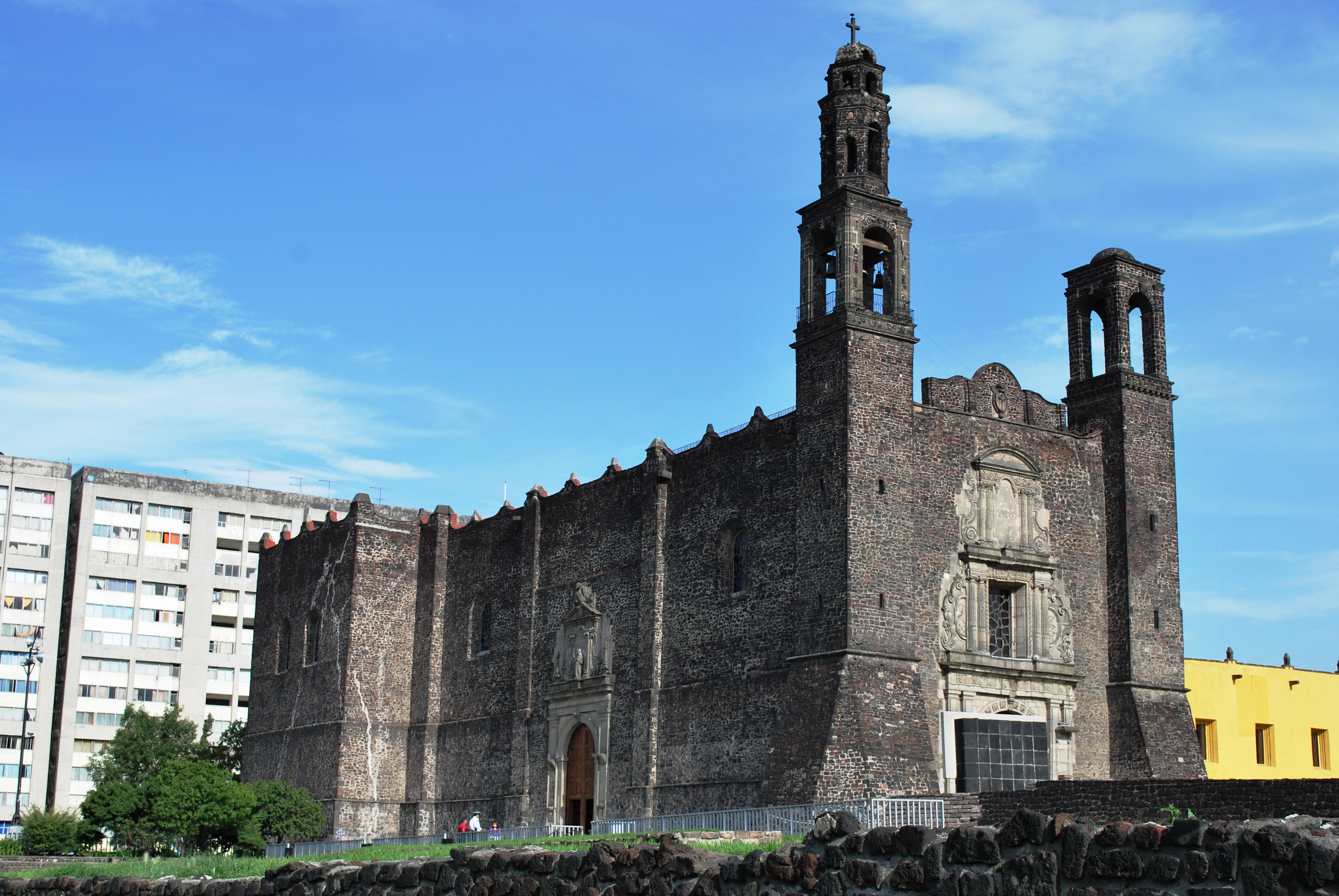
The Church of Santiago Tlatelolco, Mexico City.

The crown and the Franciscans had hopes for the training of indigenous men to become ordained Catholic priests, and with the sponsorship of Bishop Juan de Zumárraga and Don Antonio de Mendoza, the Colegio de Santa Cruz de Tlatelolco was established in 1536, in an indigenous section of Mexico City. Several prominent Franciscans, including Bernardino de Sahagún taught at the school, but the Franciscans concluded that although their elite Indian students were capable of high learning, their failure to maintain life habits expected of a friar resulted in the ending of their religious education toward ordination.

In 1555 the First Mexican Provincial Council banned Indians from ordination to the priesthood. The failure to create a Christian priesthood of indigenous men has been deemed a major failure of the Catholic Church in Mexico. With the banning of ordination for indigenous men, the priest was always a Spaniard (and in later years one who passed as one). The highest religious official in Indian towns was the fiscal, who was a nobleman who aided the priest in the affairs of the church.

The Colegio continued for a number of decades more, with some of its most able students becoming participants in Sahagún's project to compile information about the prehispanic Aztecs in order that Christian evangelization would be more effective. The twelve-volume magnum opus The General History of the Things of New Spain, completed in the 1570s, is one of the high achievements of the early colonial period, published in English as the Florentine Codex.

=== Mendicant-produced texts for evangelization ===
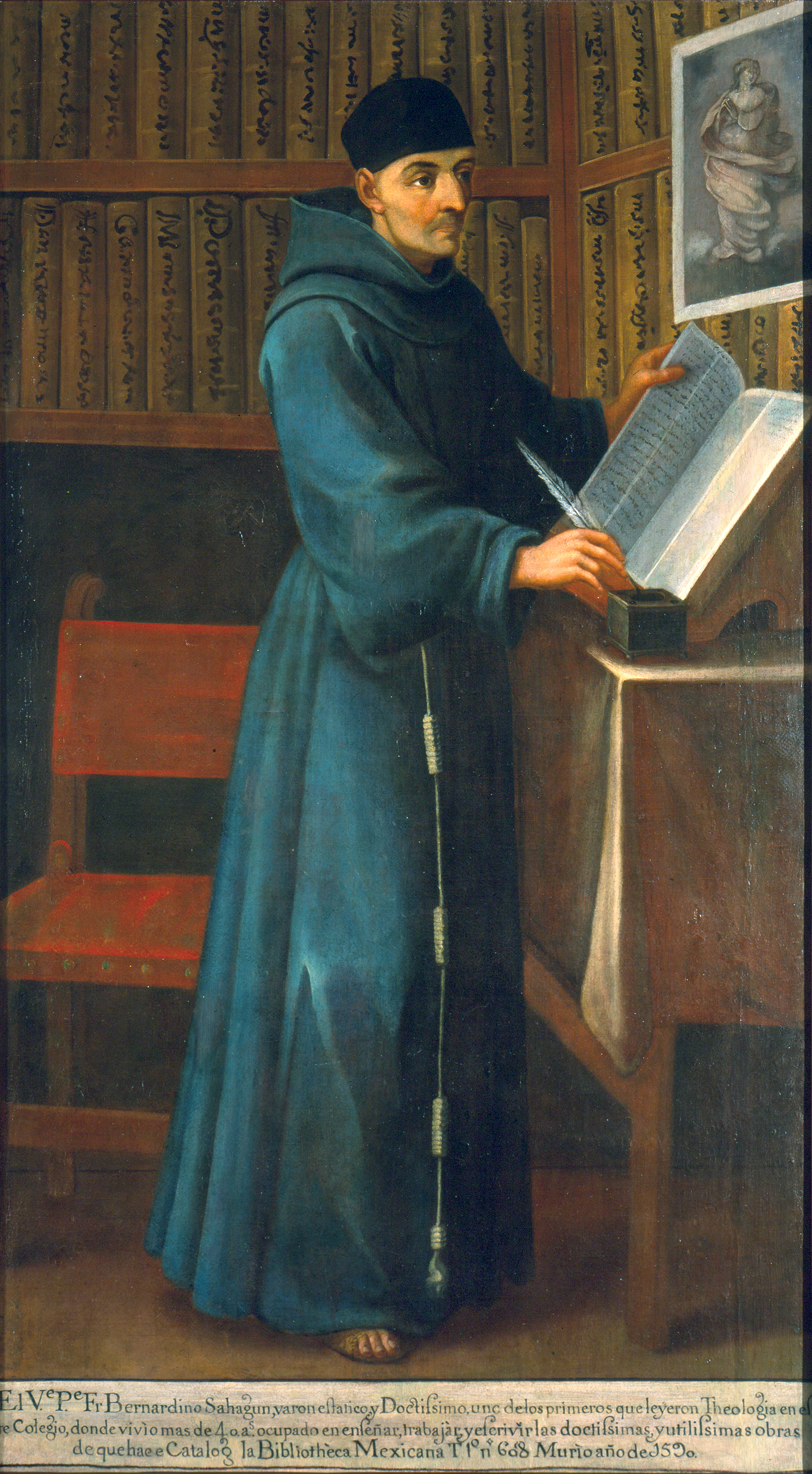
Friar Bernardino de Sahagún

The Franciscans were especially prolific in creating materials so that they could evangelize in the indigenous language, which in Central Mexico was Nahuatl, the language of the Aztecs and other groups. Fray Andrés de Olmos completed a manual designed to teach the friars Nahuatl. Fray Alonso de Molina compiled a bilingual dictionary in Nahuatl (Mexicana) and Spanish (Castellano) to aid the friars in teaching and preaching. He also created a bilingual confessional manual, so that friars could hear confessions in Nahuatl.

Bernardino de Sahagún wrote a book of psalms in Nahuatl for friars to use in their preaching; it was the only one of his many works that was published in his lifetime. When friars began to evangelize elsewhere in New Spain where there were other indigenous groups, they created similar materials in languages as diverse as Zapotec, Maya, and Chinantec. Increasingly the crown became hostile to the production of materials in indigenous languages, so that Sahagún's multivolume General History was not a model for such works elsewhere in Mexico.

One of the major challenges for friars in creating such materials was to find words and phrasing that evoked the sacred without confusing the indigenous about Christianity and their old beliefs. For that reason, a whole series of words from Spanish and a few from Latin were incorporated as loanwords into Nahuatl to denote God (Dios) rather than god (teotl) and others to denote new concepts, such as a last will and testament (testamento) and soul (ánima). Some Christian dichotomous concepts, such as good and evil, were not easy to convey to Nahuas, since their belief system sought a middle ground without extremes.

Fray Alonso de Molina's 1569 confessional manual had a model testament in Spanish and Nahuatl. Whether or not it was the direct model for Nahua scribes or notaries in indigenous towns, the making of testaments that were simultaneously a religious document as well as one designed to pass property to selected heirs became standard in Nahua towns during the second half of the sixteenth century and carried on as a documentary type until Mexican independence in 1821. Early testaments in Nahuatl have been invaluable for the information they provide about Nahua men and women's property holding, but the religious formulas at the beginning of wills were largely that and did not represent individual statements of belief. However, testators did order property to be sold for Masses for their souls or gave money directly to the local friar, which may well have been encouraged by the recipients but can also be the testators’ gesture of piety.

=== Hospitals ===
The friars founded 120 hospitals in the first hundred years of the colonial era, some serving only Spaniards but others exclusively for the indigenous. These hospitals for Indians were especially important since epidemics sickened and killed countless Indians after the conquest. Hernán Cortés endowed the Hospital of the Immaculate Conception, more commonly known as the Hospital de Jesús, in Mexico City, which was run by religious. Bishop Vasco de Quiroga founded hospitals in Michoacan. The crown established the Royal Indian Hospital (Hospital Real de Indios or Hospital Real de Naturales) in Mexico city in 1553, which functioned until 1822 when Mexico gained its independence.

Although the Royal Indian Hospital was a crown institution and not an ecclesiastical one, the nursing staff during the eighteenth century was the brothers of the religious order of San Hipólito. The order was founded in Mexico by Bernardino de Alvarez (1514–1584), and it established a number of hospitals. The religious order was to be removed from its role at the Royal Indian Hospital by a royal decree (cédula) after an investigation into allegations of irregularities, and the brothers were to return to their convent.

Hospitals were not just places to treat the sick and dying, but were spiritual institutions as well. At the Royal Indian Hospital, the ordinances for governing called for four chaplains, appointed by the crown and not the church, to minister to the sick and dying. All four had to be proficient in either Nahuatl or Otomi, with two to serve in each language. Although many secular clerics without a benefice held multiple posts in order to make a living, the chaplains at the Royal Indian Hospital were forbidden to serve elsewhere.

=== Confraternities ===
Organizations that were more in the hands of the indigenous were confraternities (cofradías) founded in the Nahua area starting in the late sixteenth century and were established elsewhere in indigenous communities. Confraternities functioned as burial societies for their members, celebrated their patron saint, and conducted other religious activities, nominally under the supervision of a priest, but like their European counterparts there was considerable power in the hands of the lay leadership. Confraternities usually had religious banners, many of their officials wore special ritual attire, and they participated in larger religious festivities as an identifiable group. For Indians and Blacks, these religious organizations promoted both their spiritual life and their sense of community, since their membership was exclusively of those groups and excluded Spaniards. On the contrary, limpieza (pure Spanish blood) status was gradually necessary for certain religious orders, confraternities, convents, and guilds.

In one Nahua sodality in Tula, women not only participated but held publicly religious office. When the confraternity was given official recognition in 1631, they are noted in the confraternity's records in Nahuatl: "Four mothers of people in holy matters [who are] to take good care of the holy cofradía so it will be much respected, and they are to urge those who have not yet joined the cofradía to enter, and they are to take care of the brothers [and sisters] who are sick, and the orphans; they are to see to what is needed for their souls and what pertains to their earthly bodies."

In the Maya area, confraternities had considerable economic power since they held land in the name of their patron saint and the crops went to the support of the saint's cult. The cah's (indigenous community) retention of considerable land via the confraternities was a way the Maya communities avoided colonial officials, the clergy, or even indigenous rulers (gobernadores) from diverting of community revenues in their cajas de comunidad (literally community-owned chests that had locks and keys). "[I]n Yucatan the cofradía in its modified form was the community."

== Spanish Habsburg Era (1550–1700) ==
=== Establishment of the episcopal hierarchy and the assertion of crown control ===
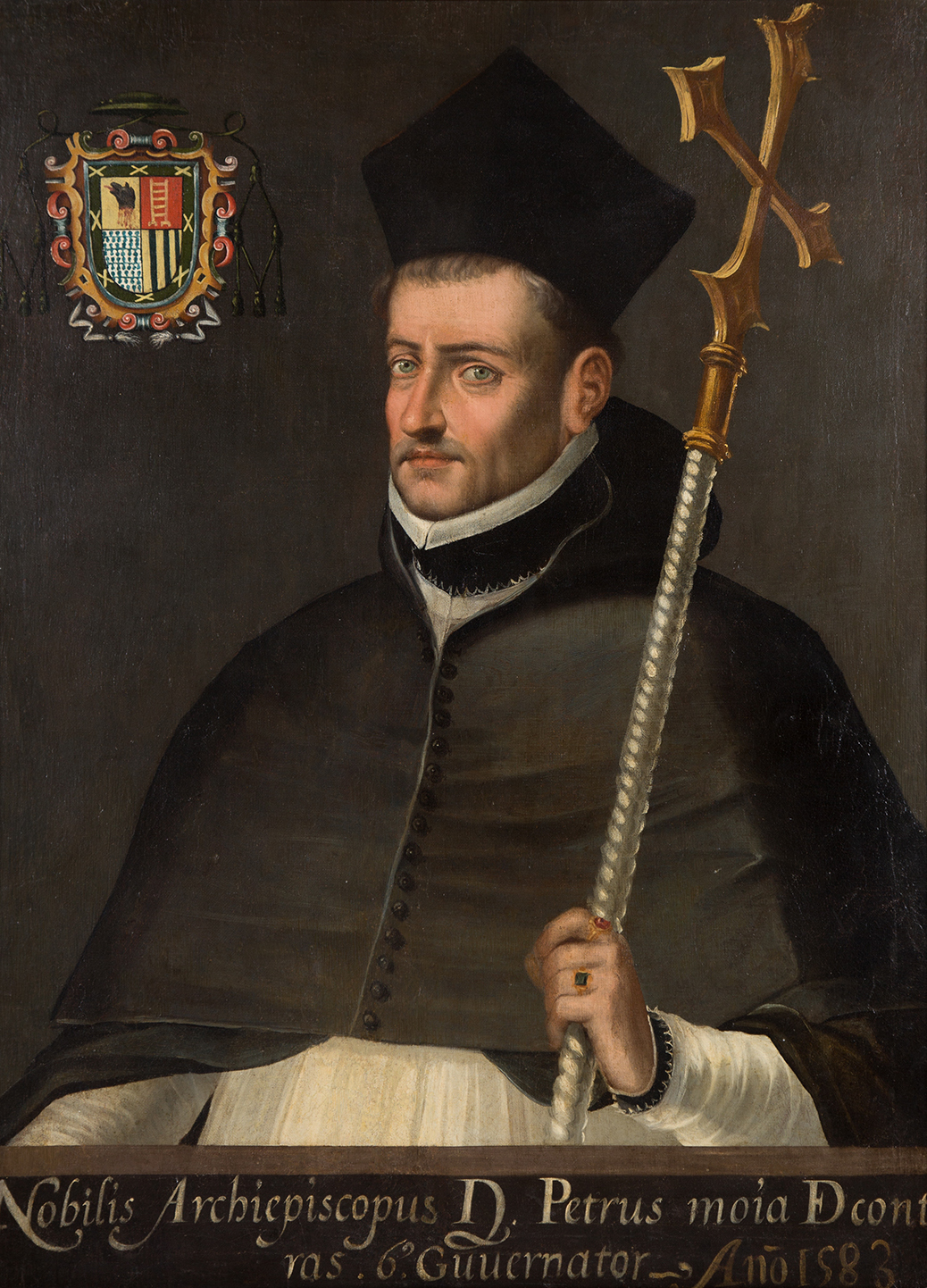
Don Pedro Moya de Contreras, first secular cleric to be archbishop of Mexico and first cleric to serve as viceroy.

The Catholic Church is organized by territorial districts or dioceses, each with a bishop. The main church of a diocese is the cathedral. The diocese of Mexico was established in Mexico City in 1530. Initially, Mexico was not an episcopal jurisdiction in its own right; until 1547 it was under the authority of the Archbishop of Seville (Spain).

The first bishop of Mexico was Franciscan friar Don Juan de Zumárraga. The church that became the first cathedral was begun in 1524 on the main square Zócalo and consecrated in 1532. In general, a member of a mendicant order was not appointed to a high position in the episcopal hierarchy, so Zumárraga and his successor Dominican Alonso de Montúfar (r. 1551–1572) as bishops of Mexico should be seen as atypical figures. In 1572 Pedro Moya de Contreras became the first bishop of Mexico who was a secular cleric.

=== Bishops as interim viceroys ===
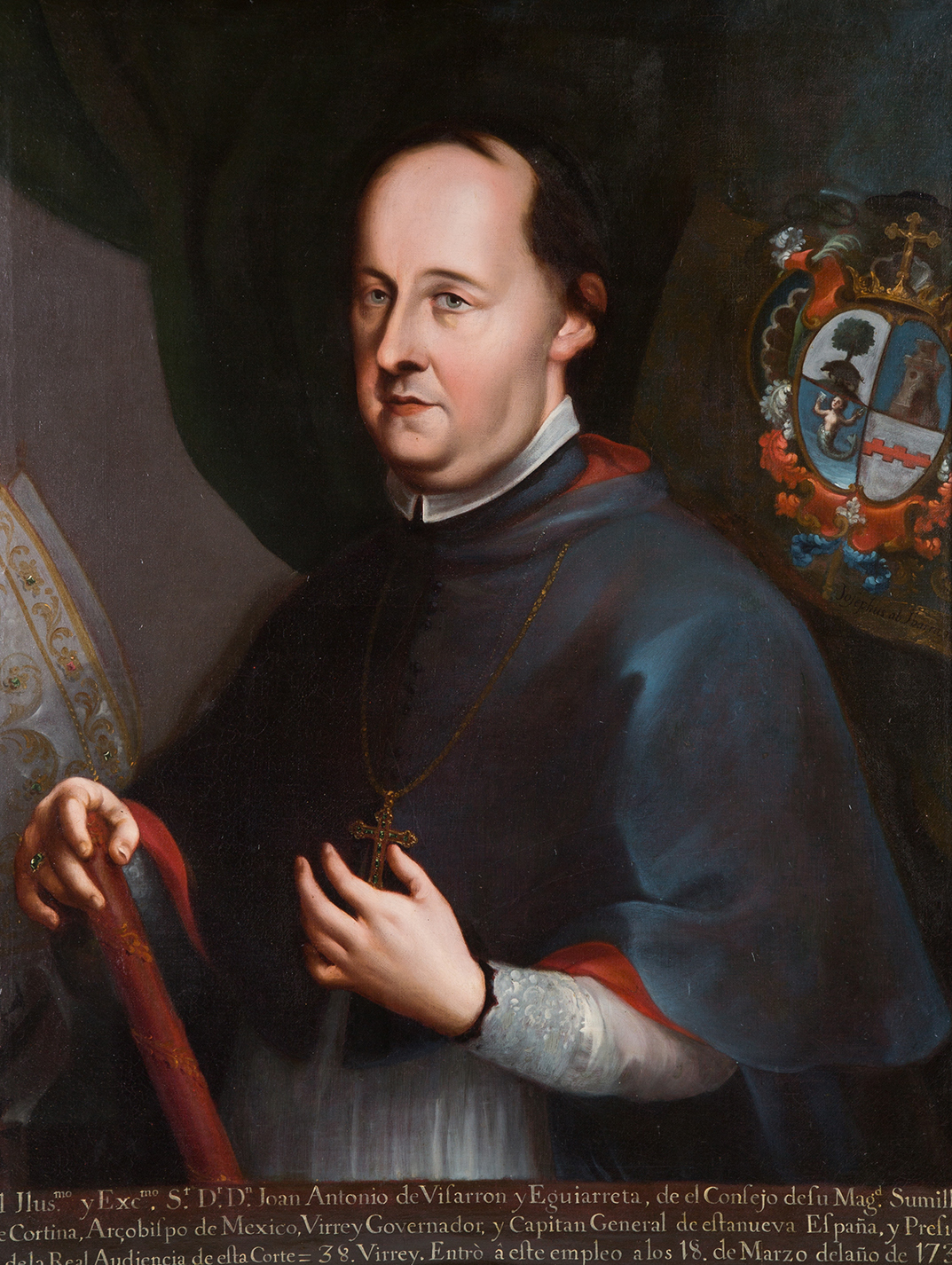
Archbishop Juan Antonio de Vizarrón, Viceroy of New Spain, served an unusually long term as interim viceroy 1734–1740.

The crown established the viceroyalty of New Spain, appointing high-born Spaniards loyal to the crown as the top civil official. On occasion in all three centuries of Spanish rule, the crown appointed archbishops or bishops as viceroy of New Spain, usually on an interim basis, until a new viceroy was sent from Spain. Pedro Moya de Contreras was the first secular cleric to be appointed archbishop of Mexico and he was also the first cleric to serve as viceroy, September 25, 1584 – October 17, 1585.

The seventeenth century saw the largest number of clerics as viceroys. The Dominican García Guerra served from June 19, 1611 – February 22, 1612. Blessed Don Juan de Palafox y Mendoza also served briefly as viceroy, June 10, 1642 – November 23, 1642. Marcos de Torres y Rueda, bishop of Yucatán, served from May 15, 1648 – April 22, 1649. Diego Osorio de Escobar y Llamas, bishop of Puebla, served from June 29, 1664 – October 15, 1664. Archbishop of the Roman Catholic Archdiocese of Mexico Payo Enríquez de Rivera Manrique, O.S.A., served an unusually long term as viceroy, from December 13, 1673, to November 7, 1680. Another unusual cleric-viceroy was Juan Ortega y Montañés, archbishop of Mexico City archdiocese, who served twice as interim viceroy, February 27, 1696, to December 18, 1696, and again from November 4, 1701, to November 27, 1702.

Once the Spanish Bourbon monarchy was established, just three clerics served as viceroy. Archbishop of Mexico City Juan Antonio de Vizarrón y Eguiarreta, served six years as viceroy, March 17, 1734, to August 17, 1740. The last two cleric-viceroys followed the more usual pattern of being interim. Alonso Núñez de Haro y Peralta, archbishop of Mexico City, served from May 8, 1787, to August 16, 1787, and Francisco Javier de Lizana y Beaumont, archbishop of Mexico City, served from July 19, 1809, to May 8, 1810.

=== Structure of the episcopal hierarchy ===
The ecclesiastical structure was ruled by a bishop, who had considerable power encompassing legislative, executive, and judicial matters. A bishop ruled over a geographical district, a diocese, subdivided into parishes, each with a parish priest. The seat of the diocese was its cathedral, which had its own administration, the cabildo eclesiástico whose senior official was the dean of the cathedral.

New Spain became the seat of an archbishopric in 1530, with the archbishop overseeing multiple dioceses. The diocese of Michoacan (now Morelía) became an archdiocese in the sixteenth century as well. The creation of further dioceses in Mexico is marked by the construction of cathedrals in the main cities: the cathedral in Antequera (now Oaxaca City) (1535), the Guadalajara Cathedral (1541), the Puebla Cathedral 1557, the Zacatecas Cathedral (1568), the Mérida Cathedral (1598), and the Saltillo Cathedral (1762).

=== Ecclesiastical privileges ===
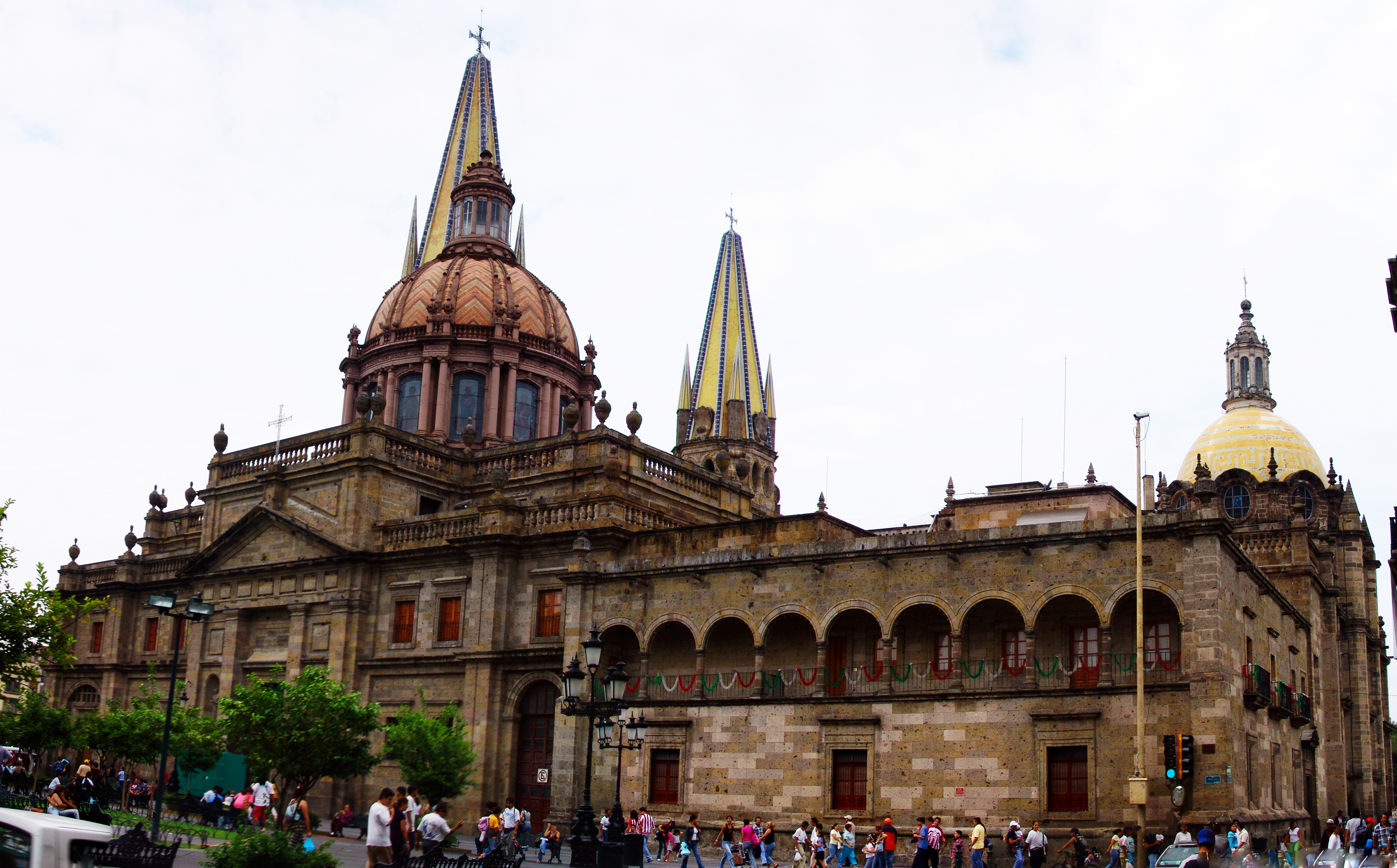
The Guadalajara Cathedral.

The ordained clergy (but not religious sisters) had ecclesiastical privileges (fueros), which meant that they were exempt from civil courts, no matter what the offense, but were tried in canonical courts. This separation of jurisdictions for different groups meant that the Church had considerable independent power. In the late eighteenth century, one of the Bourbon Reforms was the removal of this fuero, making the clergy subject to civil courts.

=== Secular or diocesan clergy's income ===
Members of the upper levels of the hierarchy, parish priests, and priests who functioned in religious institutions such as hospitals, received a salaried income, a benefice. However, not all ordained priests had a secure income from such benefices and had to find a way to make a living. Since secular priests did not take a vow of poverty, they often pursued economic functions like any other member of Hispanic society. An example of a secular cleric piecing together an income from multiple posts is Don Carlos de Sigüenza y Góngora, one of New Spain's most distinguished intellectuals, who had no benefice.

=== Reduction of mendicants' role ===
In the sixteenth century, the establishment of the episcopal hierarchy was part of a larger Crown policy that in the early period increasingly aimed at diminishing the role of the mendicant orders as parish priests in central areas of the colony and strengthening the role of the diocesan (secular) clergy. The Ordenanza del Patronazgo was the key act of the crown asserting control over the clergy, both mendicant and secular. It was promulgated by the crown in 1574, codifying this policy, which simultaneously strengthened the crown's role, since it had the power of royal patronage over the diocesan clergy, the Patronato Real, but not the mendicant orders.

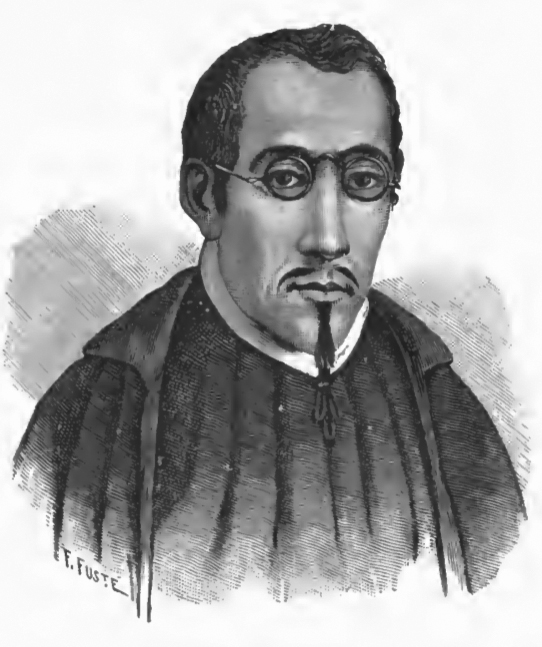
Don Carlos de Sigüenza y Góngora, priest, scientist, and creole patriot.

The Ordenanza guaranteed parish priests an income and a permanent position. Priests competed for desirable parishes through a system of competitive examinations called oposiones, with the aim of having the most qualified candidates receiving benefices. With these competitions, the winners became holders of benefices (beneficiados) and priests who did not come out on top were curates who served on an interim basis by appointment by the bishop; those who failed entirely did not even hold a temporary assignment. The importance of the Ordenanza is in the ascendancy of the diocesan clergy over the mendicants, but also indicates the growth in the Spanish population in New Spain and the necessity not only to minister to it but also to provide ecclesiastical posts for the best American-born Spaniards (creoles).

=== Pious endowments ===
One type of institution that produced income for priests without a parish or other benefice was to say Masses for the souls of men and women who had set up chantries (capellanías). Wealthy members of society would set aside funds, often by a lien on real property, to ensure Masses would be said for their souls in perpetuity. Families with an ordained priest as a member often designated him as the capellán, thus ensuring the economic well-being of one of its own. Although the endowment was for a religious purpose, the Church itself did not control the funds. It was a way that pious elite families could direct their wealth.

=== Tithes ===
The crown had significant power in the economic realm regarding the Church, since it was granted the use of tithes (a ten percent tax of agriculture) and the responsibility of collecting them. In general the crown gave these revenues for the support of the Church, and where revenues fell short, the crown supplemented them from the royal treasury.

=== Society of Jesus in Mexico, 1572–1767 ===
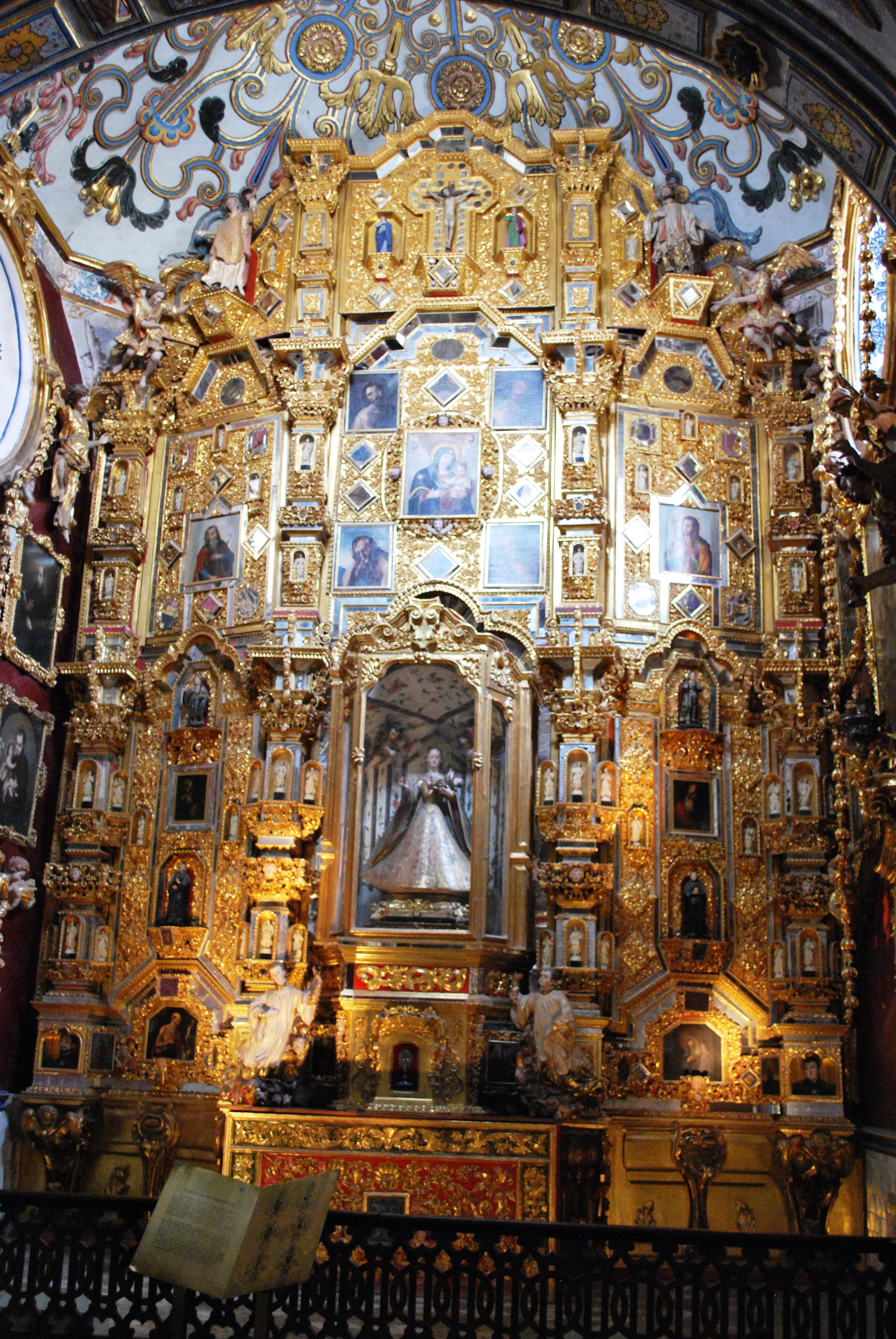
Main altar of the Jesuit colegio in Tepozotlan, now the Museo Nacional del Virreinato

At the same time that the episcopal hierarchy was established, the Society of Jesus or Jesuits, a new religious order founded on new principles, came to Mexico in 1572. The Jesuits distinguished themselves in several ways. They had high standards for acceptance to the order and many years of training. They were adept at attracting the patronage of elite families whose sons they educated in rigorous, newly founded Jesuit colegios ("colleges"), including Colegio de San Pedro y San Pablo, Colegio de San Ildefonso, and the Colegio de San Francisco Javier, Tepozotlan. Those same elite families hoped that a son with a vocation to the priesthood would be accepted as a Jesuit. Jesuits were also zealous in evangelization of the indigenous, particularly on the northern frontiers.

==== Jesuit haciendas ====
To support their colleges and members of the Society of Jesus, the Jesuits acquired landed estates that were run with the best-practices for generating income in that era. A number of these haciendas were donated by wealthy elites. The donation of an hacienda to the Jesuits was the spark igniting a conflict between seventeenth-century bishop of Puebla Don Juan de Palafox and the Jesuit colegio in that city. Since the Jesuits resisted paying the tithe on their estates, this donation effectively took revenue out of the church hierarchy's pockets by removing it from the tithe rolls.

Many Jesuit haciendas were huge, with Palafox asserting that just two colleges owned 300,000 head of sheep, whose wool was transformed locally in Puebla to cloth; six sugar plantations worth a million pesos and generating an income of 100,000 pesos. The immense Jesuit hacienda of Santa Lucía produced pulque, the fermented juice of the agave cactus whose main consumers were the lower classes and Indians in Spanish cities. Although most haciendas had a free work force of permanent or seasonal laborers, the Jesuit haciendas in Mexico had a significant number of black slaves.

The Jesuits operated their properties as an integrated unit with the larger Jesuit order; thus revenues from haciendas funded colegios. Jesuits did significantly expand missions to the indigenous in the frontier area and a number were martyred, but the crown supported those missions. Mendicant orders that had real estate were less economically integrated, so that some individual houses were wealthy while others struggled economically. The Franciscans, who were founded as an order embracing poverty, did not accumulate real estate, unlike the Augustinians and Dominicans in Mexico.

==== Jesuit resistance to the tithe ====
The Jesuits engaged in conflict with the episcopal hierarchy over the question of payment of tithes, the ten percent tax on agriculture levied on landed estates for support of the Church hierarchy, from bishops and cathedral chapters to parish priests. Since the Jesuits were the largest religious order holding real estate, surpassing the Dominicans and Augustinians who had accumulated significant property, this was no small matter. They argued that they were exempt, due to special pontifical privileges. In the mid-seventeenth century, bishop of Puebla Don Juan de Palafox took on the Jesuits over this matter and was so soundly defeated that he was recalled to Spain, where he became the bishop of the minor diocese of Osma. The mendicant orders were envious of the Jesuits’ economic power and influence and the fact that fewer good candidates for their orders chose them as opposed to the Jesuits.

==== Expulsion of the Jesuits 1767 ====
In 1767, the Spanish crown ordered the expulsion of the Jesuits from Spain and its overseas territories. Their properties passed into the hands of elites who had the wherewithal to buy them. The mendicants did not protest their expulsion. The Jesuits had established missions in Baja California prior to their expulsion. These were taken over by the Franciscans, who then went on to establish 21 missions in Alta California.

=== Convents ===
==== Establishments for elite creole women ====
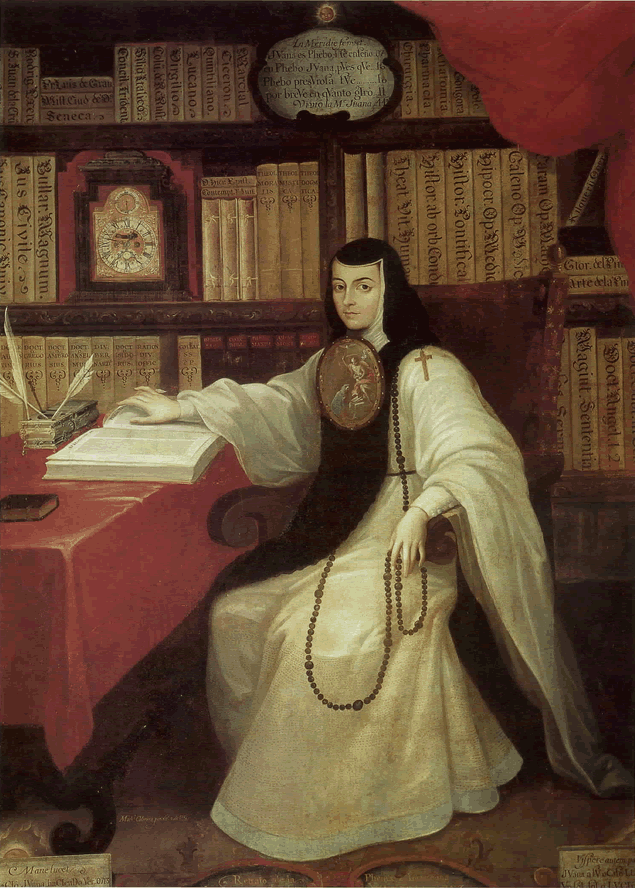
Sor Juana Inés de la Cruz, religious sister, poet, and playwright, was famous in her lifetime in both Mexico and Spain.

In the first generation of Spaniards in New Spain, women emigrated to join existing kin, generally marrying. With few marital partners of equal calidad for Spanish men, there was pressure for Spanish women to marry rather than take the veil as a cloistered nun. However, as more Spanish families were created and there were a larger number of daughters, the social economy could accommodate the creation of nunneries for women. The first convent in New Spain was founded in 1540 in Mexico City by the Conceptionist Order. Mexico City had the largest number of nunneries with 22. Puebla, New Spain's second largest city, had 11, with its first in 1568; Guadalajara had 6, starting in 1578; Antequera (Oaxaca), had 5, starting in 1576. In all, there were 56 convents for creole women in New Spain, with the greatest number in the largest cities. However, even a few relatively small provincial cities had convents, including Pátzcuaro (1744), San Miguel el Grande (1754), Aguascalientes (1705-07), Mérida (Yucatán) 1596, and San Cristóbal (Chiapas) 1595. The last nunnery before independence in 1821 was in Mexico City in 1811, Nuestra Señora de Guadalupe. Over the colonial period, there were 56 nunneries established in New Spain, the largest number being the Conceptionists with 15, followed by Franciscans at 14, Dominicans with 9, and Carmelites with 7. Sor Juana's Jeronymite order had only 3 houses. The largest concentration of convents was in the capital, Mexico City, with 11 built between 1540 and 1630, and, by 1780 another 10 for a total of 21.

These institutions were designed for the daughters of elites, with individual living quarters not only for the nuns, but also their servants. Depending on the particular religious order, the discipline was more or less strict. The Carmelites were strictly observant, which prompted Doña Juana Asbaje y Ramírez de Santillana to withdraw from their community and join the Jeronymite nunnery in Mexico City, becoming Sor Juana Inés de la Cruz, known in her lifetime as the "Tenth Muse".

Nuns were enclosed in their convents, but some orders regularly permitted visits from the nuns’ family members (and in Sor Juana's case, the viceroy and his wife the virreina), as well as her friend, the priest and savant Don Carlos de Sigüenza y Góngora. Nuns were required to provide a significant dowry to the nunnery on their entrance. As "brides of Christ", nuns often entered the nunnery with an elaborate ceremony that was an occasion for the family to display not only its piety but also its wealth.

Nunneries accumulated wealth due to the dowries donated for the care of nuns when they entered. Many nunneries also acquired urban real estate, whose rents were a steady source of income to that particular house.

==== Establishments for Indian noblewomen ====
In the eighteenth century, the Poor Clares established a convent for noble Indian women. The debate leading up to the creation of the convent of Corpus Christi in 1724 was another round of debate about the capacity of Indians, male or female, for religious life. The early sixteenth century had seen the demise of the Colegio de Santa Cruz de Tlatelolco, which had been founded to train Indian men for ordination.

=== Holy Office of the Inquisition ===
At the same time that the episcopal hierarchy in Mexico first had a secular cleric as archbishop, the tribunal of the Holy Office of the Inquisition was established in 1569 to maintain orthodoxy and Christian morality. In 1570, Indians were removed from the Inquisition's jurisdiction.

==== Crypto-Jews ====
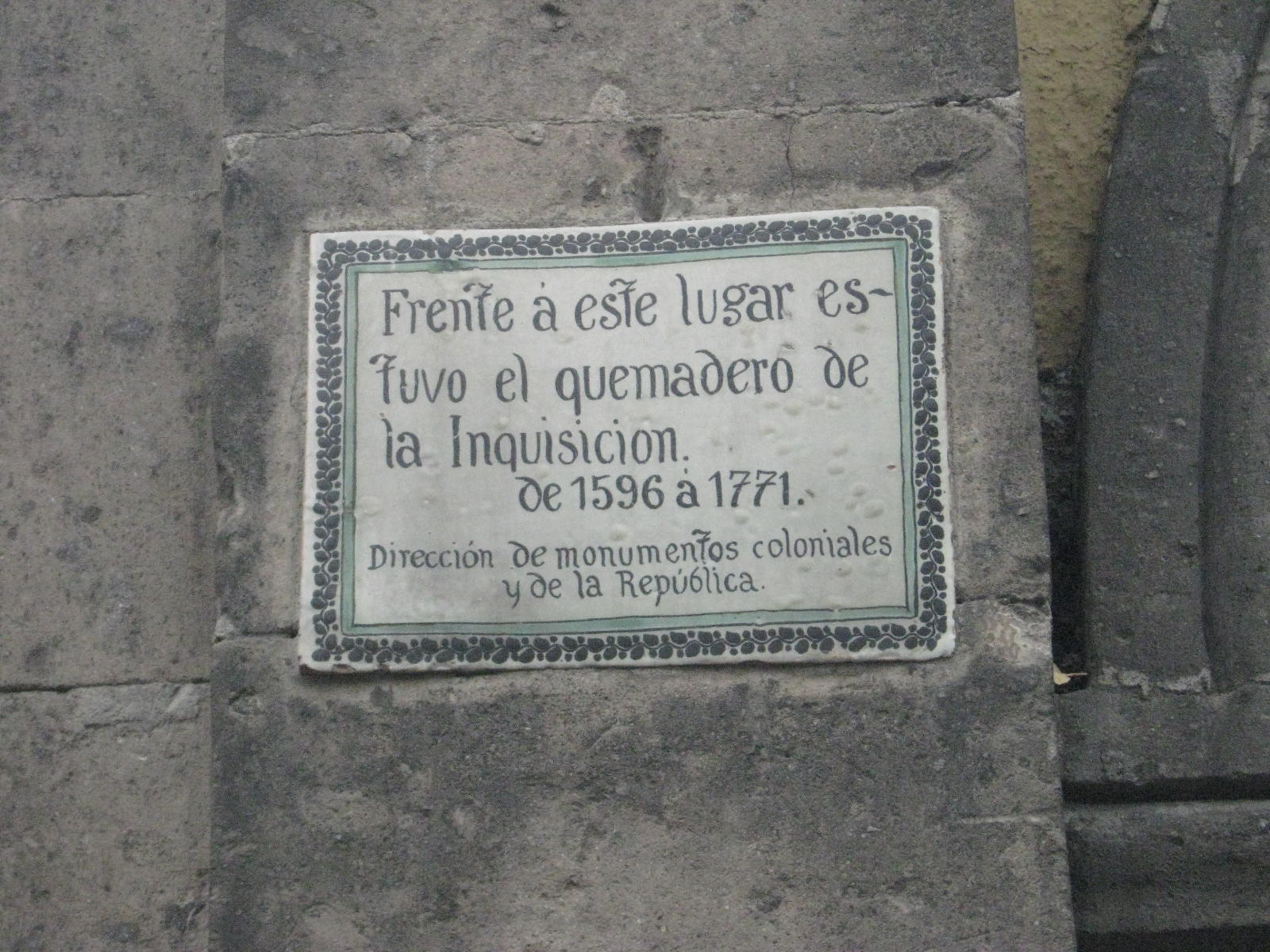
The plaque says "In front of this place was the quemadero (burning place) of the Inquisition. 1596–1771". The Inquisition tried those accused, but did not itself have the power to execute the convicted. They were turned over ("relaxed") to secular authorities for capital punishment.

Non-Catholics were banned from emigrating to Spain's overseas territories, with potential migrants needing to receive a license to travel that stated they were of pure Catholic heritage. However, a number of crypto-Jews, that is, Jews who supposedly converted to Christianity (conversos) but continued practicing Judaism, did emigrate. Many were merchants of Portuguese background, who could more easily move within the Spanish realms during the period 1580–1640 when Spain and Portugal had the same monarch.

The Portuguese empire included territories in West Africa and was the source of African slaves sold in Spanish territories. Quite a number of Portuguese merchants in Mexico were involved in the transatlantic slave trade. When Portugal successfully revolted against Spanish rule in 1640, the Inquisition in Mexico began to closely scrutinize the merchant community in which many Portuguese merchants were crypto-Jews. In 1649, crypto-Jews both living and dead were "relaxed to the secular arm" of crown justice for punishment. The Inquisition had no power to execute the convicted, so civil justice carried out capital punishment in a grand public ceremony affirming the power of Christianity and the State.

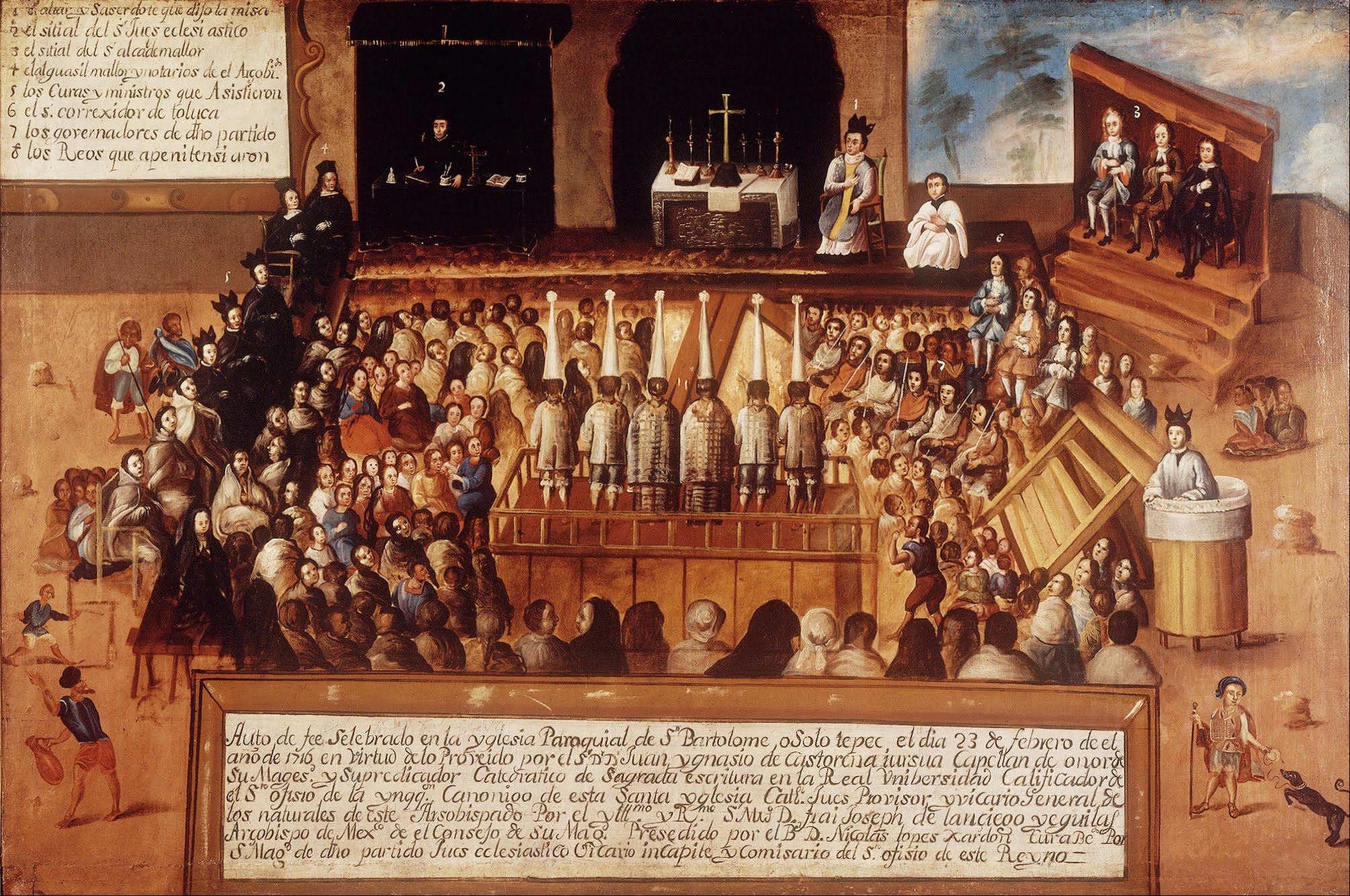
An auto-da-fé in New Spain, 18th century

The Gran Auto de Fe of 1649 saw Crypto-Jews burned alive, while the effigies or statues along with the bones of others were burned. Although the trial and punishment of those already dead might seem bizarre to those in the modern era, the disinterment of the remains of crypto-Jews from Christian sacred ground and then burning their remains protected living and dead Christians from the pollution of those who rejected Christ. A spectacular case of sedition was prosecuted a decade later in 1659, the case of Irishman William Lamport, also known as Don Guillén de Lampart y Guzmán, who was executed in an auto de fe.

==== Other jurisdictional transgressions ====
In general though the Inquisition imposed penalties that were far less stringent than capital punishment. They prosecuted cases of bigamy, blasphemy, Lutheranism (Protestantism), witchcraft, and, in the eighteenth century, sedition against the crown was added to the Inquisition's jurisdiction. Historians have in recent decades utilized Inquisition records to find information on a broad range of those in the Hispanic sector and discern social and cultural patterns and colonial ideas of deviance.

==== Indigenous beliefs ====
Indigenous men and women were excluded from the jurisdiction of the Inquisition when it was established, but there were on-going concerns about indigenous beliefs and practice. In 1629, Hernando Riz de Alarcón wrote the Treatise on the Heathen Superstitions that today live among the Indians native to this New Spain. 1629. Little is known about Ruiz de Alarcón himself, but his work is an important contribution to early Mexico for understanding Nahua religion, beliefs, and medicine. He collected information about Nahuas in what is now modern Guerrero. He came to the attention of the Inquisition for conducting autos-de-fe and punishing Indians without authority. The Holy Office exonerated him due to his ignorance and then appointed him to a position to inform the Holy Office of pagan practices, resulting in the Treatise on the Heathen Superstitions.

=== Devotions to holy men and women ===
==== Virgin of Guadalupe and other devotions to Mary ====
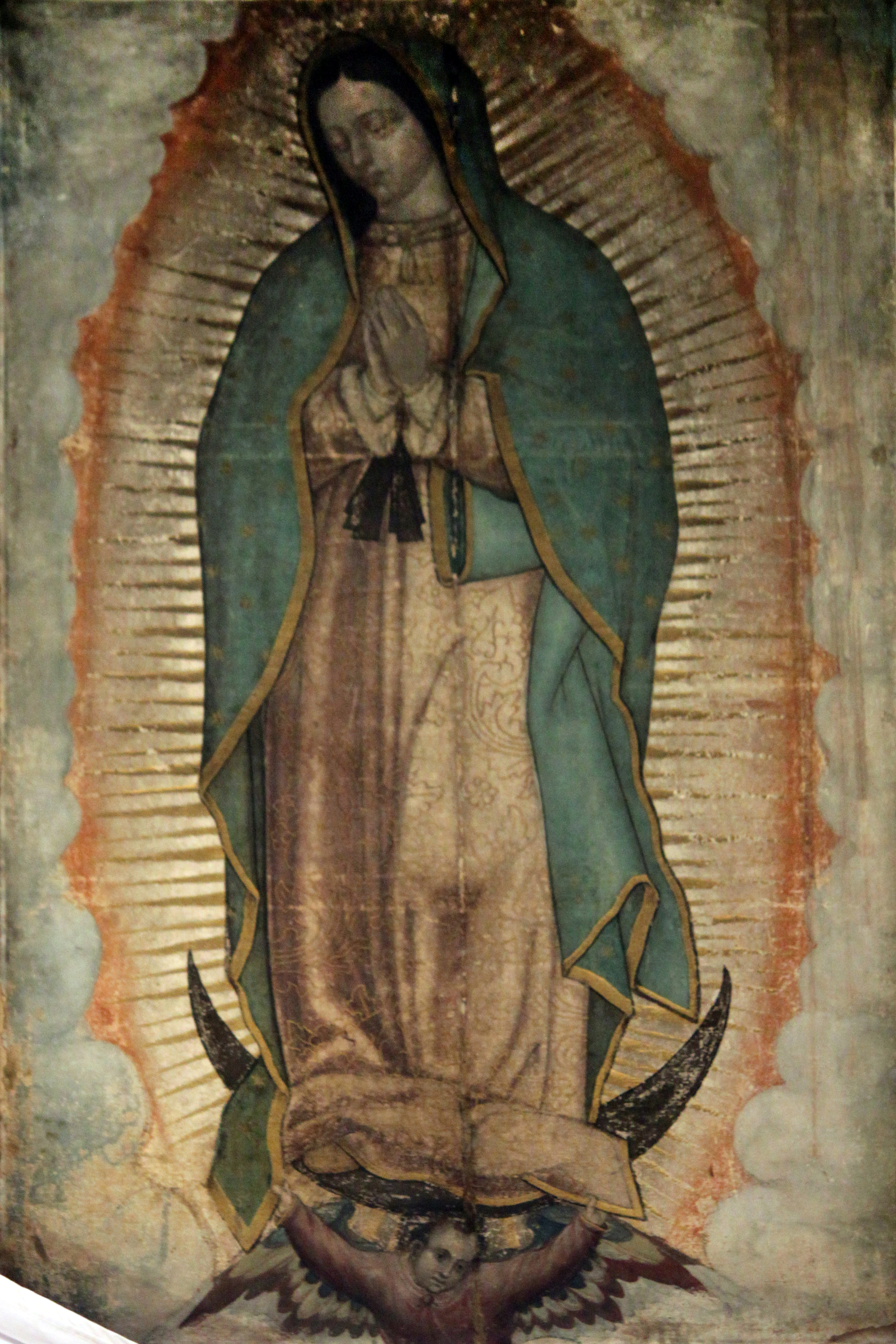
Our Lady of Guadalupe.

In 1531, a Nahua, Juan Diego, is said to have experienced a vision of a young girl on the site of a destroyed temple to a mother goddess. The cult of the Virgin of Guadalupe was promoted by Dominican archbishop of Mexico, Alonso de Montúfar, while Franciscans such as Bernardino de Sahagún were deeply suspicious because of the possibility of confusion and idolatry.

The vision became embodied in a physical object, the cloak or tilma on which the image of the Virgin appeared. This ultimately became known as Our Lady of Guadalupe.

The widespread conversion of the Indigenous people of Mexico, especially the Nahua, didn’t solely come from the Spanish claiming that there was a sudden miracle of certain proof that their religion was the correct one, but also what the Nahua perceived in the story. For one, the hill of Tepeyacac, as is the original name, was previously the site of worship for another goddess, Tonantzin, whose name means “our mother”, and was the mother of the gods and considered an earth deity similar to the figure of Mother Earth, as noted by friar Bernardino de Sahagún. As previously mentioned, aspects of Catholicism often got lost in translation, however, in this case, the comparisons were easier for Nahua to process: the mother of a god, who appeared on a holy hill of worship, symbolically declaring herself mother of all on earth, which explains why even today, the Virgin of Guadalupe is sometimes referred to as Tonantzin.This combination of a mother goddess and an earth/celestial goddess is also seen in the actual image of the Virgin on the tilma, of which stars are on her turquoise cloak – an earthly symbol – the sun shining behind her, and the moon under her feet, which also displays the Catholic belief that Mary is the queen of all, as well as fitting the biblical description in the Book of Revelation.

Besides the comparisons between this new female religious figure and their old goddess, there was also the personal aspect that brought many Nahua and Indigenous people of Mexico to the religion and the cult of the Virgin of Guadalupe. Something particularly striking is the distinction in the appearance between the Virgin of Guadalupe and the standard Marian image in Europe, which boasts European features such as pale skin, blond or light brown hair, with light eyes, such as those seen in the painting The Virgin of the Navigators which was painted around the same time as the apparition at Tepeyac. In contrast, the mantle image of Mary depicts her with a tan-olive skin tone and straight black hair, which can be compared to the features of a mestiza, creating another symbol of combination between the two groups. It’s also another way of understanding that she’s just as much a mother to the Indigenous peoples as much as she is to the Spanish.

The cult of the Virgin of Guadalupe grew in importance in the seventeenth century, becoming especially associated with American-born Spaniards. In the era of independence, she was an important symbol of liberation for the insurgents.

Although the Virgin of Guadalupe is the most important Marian devotion in Mexico, she is by no means the only one. In Tlaxcala, the Virgin of Ocotlan is important; in Jalisco Our Lady of San Juan de los Lagos and the Basilica of Our Lady of Zapopan are important pilgrimage sites; in Oaxaca, the Basilica of Our Lady of Solitude is important. In the colonial period and particularly during the struggle for independence in the early nineteenth century, the Virgin of Los Remedios was the symbolic leader of the royalists defending Spanish rule in New Spain.

=== Devotions to Christ and pilgrimage sites ===
In colonial New Spain, there were several devotions to Christ with images of Christ focusing worship. A number of them were images are of a Black Christ. The Cristos Negros of Central America and Mexico included the Cristo Negro de Esquipulas; the Cristo Negro of Otatitlan, Veracruz; the Cristo Negro of San Pablo Anciano, Acatitlán de Osorio, Puebla; the Lord of Chalma, in Chalma, Malinalco. In Totolapan, Morelos, the Christ crucified image that appeared in 1543 has been the subject of a full-scale scholarly monograph.

==== Mexican saints ====
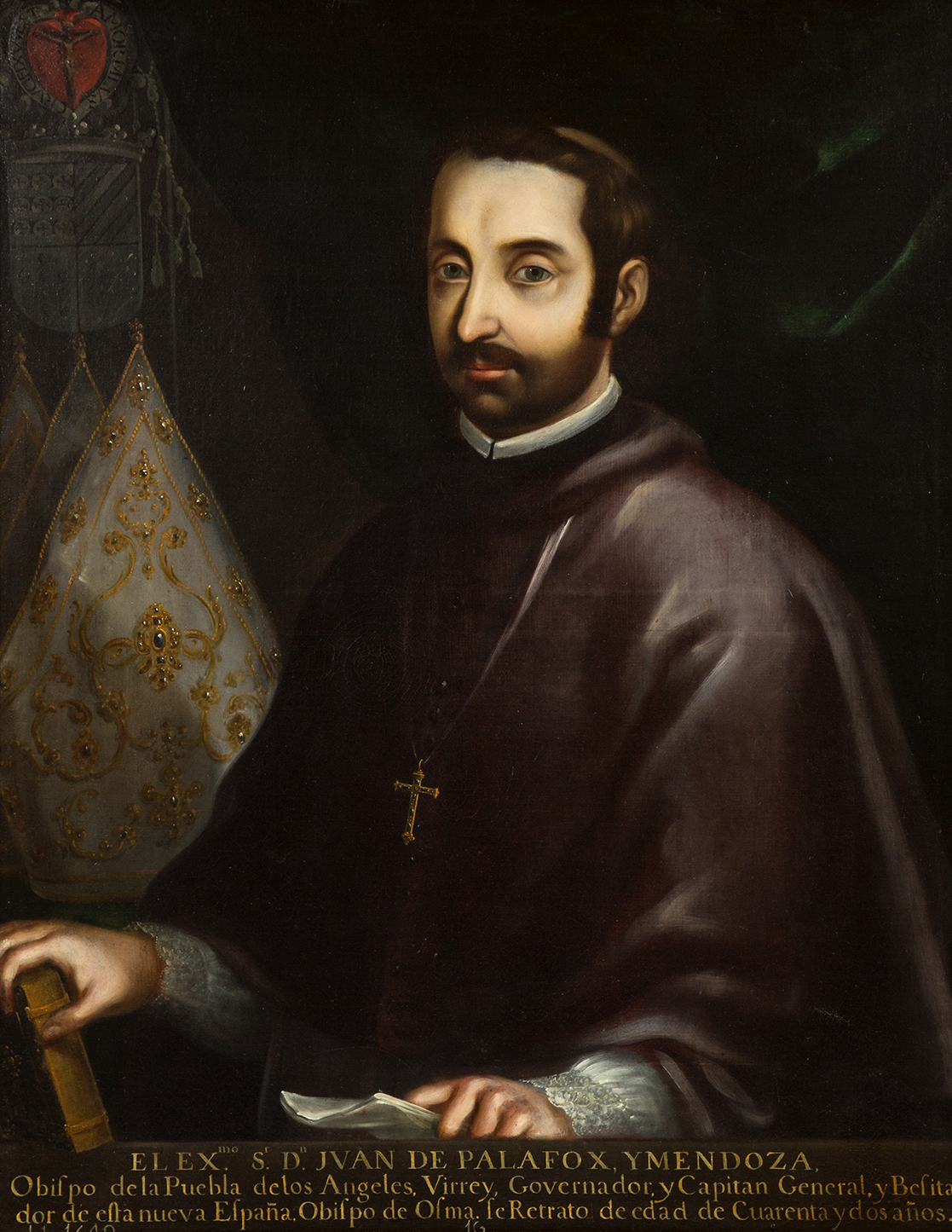
Blessed Juan de Palafox

New Spain had residents who lived holy lives and were recognized in their own communities. Late sixteenth-century Franciscan Felipe de Jesús, who was born in Mexico, became its first saint, a martyr in Japan; he was beatified in 1627, a step in the process of sainthood, and canonized a saint in 1862, during a period of conflict between Church and the liberal State in Mexico. One of the martyrs of the Japanese state's crackdown on Christians, San Felipe was crucified.

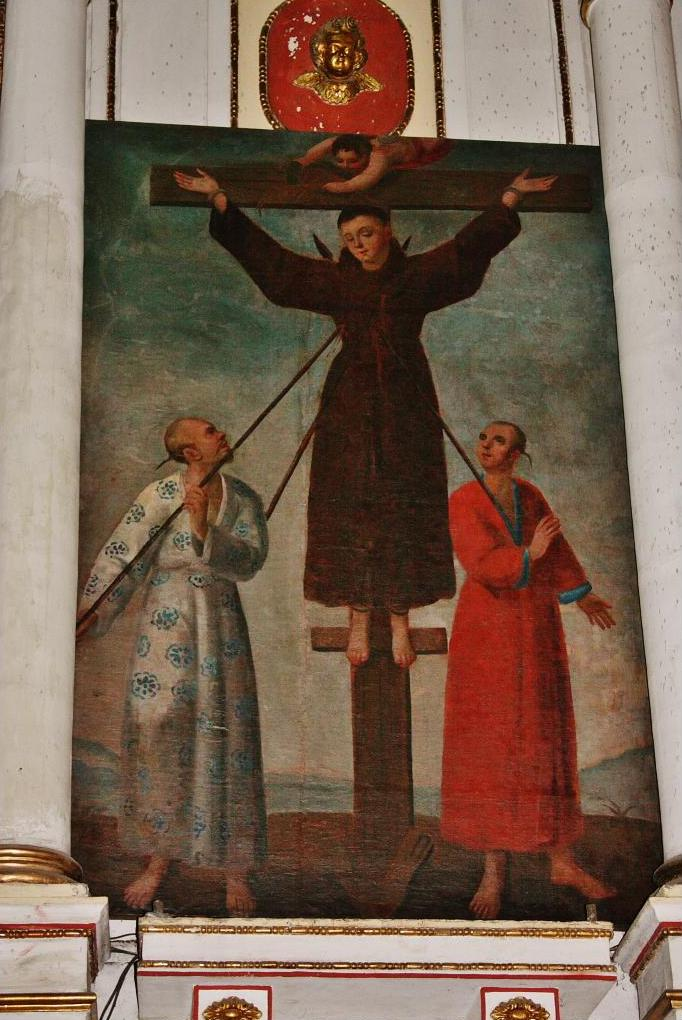
Painting of Philip of Jesus in the convent of San Antonioof Padua in Puebla.

Sebastián de Aparicio, another sixteenth-century holy person, was a lay Franciscan, an immigrant from Spain, who became a Franciscan late in life. He built a reputation for holiness in Puebla, colonial Mexico's second largest city, and was beatified (named Blessed) in 1789. Puebla was also the home of another immigrant, Catarina de San Juan, one who did not come to New Spain of her own volition, but as an Asian (China) slave.

Known as the "China Poblana" (Asian woman of Puebla), Catarina lived an exemplary life and was regarded in her lifetime as a holy woman, but the campaign for her recognition by the Vatican stalled in the seventeenth century, despite clerics’ writing her spiritual autobiography. Her status as an outsider and non-white might have affected her cause for designation as holy. Madre María de Ágreda (1602–1665), named Venerable in 1675, was a Spanish nun who, while cloistered in Spain, is said to have experienced bilocation between 1620 and 1623 and is believed to have helped evangelize the Jumano Indians of west Texas and New Mexico.

In the twentieth century, the Vatican beatified in 1988 eighteenth-century Franciscan Junípero Serra (1713–84) and canonized him in 2015. He founded most of the Franciscan Missions of California. Seventeenth-century bishop of Puebla and Osma (Spain), Don Juan de Palafox y Mendoza was beatified in 2011 by Benedict XVI. The Niños Mártires de Tlaxcala (child martyrs of Tlaxcala), who died during the initial "spiritual conquest" of the 1520s, were the first lay Catholics from the Americas beatified, done in 1990 by John Paul II.

Juan Diego, the Nahua who is credited with the vision of Our Lady of Guadalupe was beatified in 1990 and canonized in 2002 by John Paul II in the Basilica of Our Lady of Guadalupe.

The Church has also canonized a number of twentieth-century Saints of the Cristero War; Father Miguel Pro was beatified in 1988 by John Paul II.

== Spanish Bourbon Era 1700–1821 ==
With the death of Charles II of Spain in 1700 without heir, the crown of Spain was contested by European powers in the War of the Spanish Succession. The candidate from the French House of Bourbon royal line became Philip V of Spain, coming to power in 1714. Initially, in terms of ecclesiastical matters there were no major changes, but the Bourbon monarchs in both France and Spain began making major changes to existing political, ecclesiastical, and economic arrangements, collectively known as the Bourbon Reforms. Church-state Bourbon policy shifted toward an increase in state power and a decrease in ecclesiastical.

The Patronato Real ceding the crown power in the ecclesiastical sphere continued in force, but the centralizing tendencies of the Bourbon state meant that policies were implemented that directly affected clerics. Most prominent of these was the attack on the special privileges of the clergy, the fuero eclesiástico which exempted churchmen from prosecution in civil courts.

Bourbon policy also began to systematically exclude American-born Spaniards from high ecclesiastical and civil office while privileging peninsular Spaniards. The Bourbon crown diminished the power and influence of parish priests, secularized missions founded by the mendicant orders (meaning that the secular or diocesan clergy rather than the orders were in charge). An even more sweeping change was the expulsion of the Jesuits from Spain and Spain's overseas territories in 1767. The crown expanded the jurisdiction of the Inquisition to include sedition against the crown.

The crown also expanded its reach into ecclesiastical matters by bringing in new laws that empowered families to veto the marriage choices of their offspring. This disproportionately affected elite families, giving them the ability to prevent marriages to those they deemed social or racial unequals. Previously, the regulation of marriage was in the hands of the Church, which consistently supported a couple's decision to marry even when the family objected. With generations of racial mixing in Mexico in a process termed mestizaje, elite families had anxiety about interlopers who were of inferior racial status.

=== Changes in the Church as an economic institution ===
In the economic sphere, the Church had acquired a significant amount of property, particularly in Central Mexico, and the Jesuits ran efficient and profitable haciendas, such as that of Santa Lucía. More important, however, was the Church's taking the role of the major lender for mortgages. Until the nineteenth century in Mexico, there were no banks in the modern sense, so that those needing credit to finance real estate acquisitions turned to the Church as a banker.

The Church had accumulated wealth from donations by patrons. That capital was too significant to let sit idle, so it was lent to reputable borrowers, generally at 5 percent interest. Thus, elite land owners had access to credit to finance acquisitions of property and infrastructure improvement, with multi-decade mortgages. Many elite families’ consumption patterns were such that they made little progress on paying off the principal and many estates were very heavily mortgaged to the Church. Estates were also burdened with liens on their income to pay for the salary of the family's capellan, a priest guaranteed an income to say Masses for the founder of the capellanía.

The Bourbon crown attempted to eliminate capellanías entirely. The lower secular clergy was significantly affected, many of whom not having a steady income via a benefice, or having a benefice insufficient to support them.

The Bourbon monarchy increasingly tried to gain control over ecclesiastical funds for their own purposes. They eliminated tax exemptions for ecclesiastical donations, put a 15% tax on property passing into the hands of the Church in mortmain. Most serious for elite creole families was the crown's law, the Act of Consolidation in 1804, which changed the terms of mortgages. Rather than long-term mortgages with a modest schedule of repayment, the crown sought to gain access to that capital immediately. Thus, families were suddenly faced with paying off the entire mortgage without the wherewithal to gain access to other credit. It was economically ruinous to many elite families and is considered a factor in elite creoles’ alienation from the Spanish crown.

=== Expulsion of the Jesuits 1767 ===
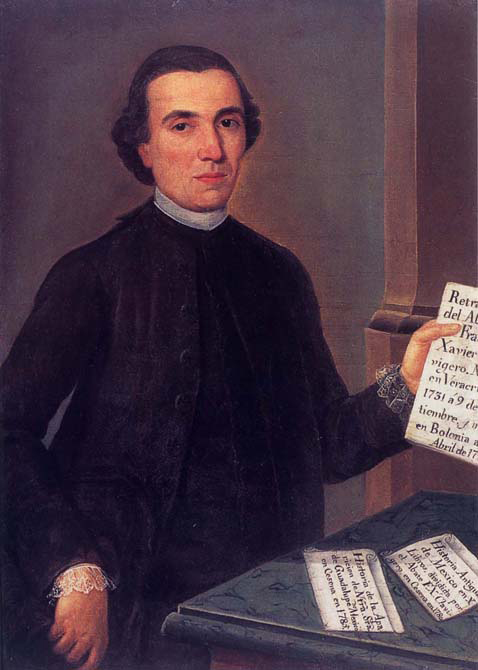
Francisco Javier Clavijero, Mexican Jesuit historian of Mexico

The Jesuits were an international order with an independence of action due to its special relationship as "soldiers of the pope." The Portuguese expelled the Jesuits in 1759 and the French in 1764, so the Spanish crown's move against them was part of a larger assertion of regal power in Europe and their overseas territories. Since the Jesuits had been the premier educators of elite young men in New Spain and the preferred order if a young man had a vocation for the priesthood, the connection between the Jesuits and creole elites was close. Their churches were magnificent, sometimes more opulent than the cathedral (the main church of a diocese). Their estates were well run and profitable, funding both their educational institutions as well as frontier missions. The expulsion of the Jesuits meant the exile of their priests, many of them to Italy, and for many creole families connected to the order by placing a son there, it meant splitting of elite families. One Mexican Jesuit who was expelled was Francisco Javier Clavijero, who wrote a history of Mexico that extolled the Aztec past.

=== Charitable Institutions ===
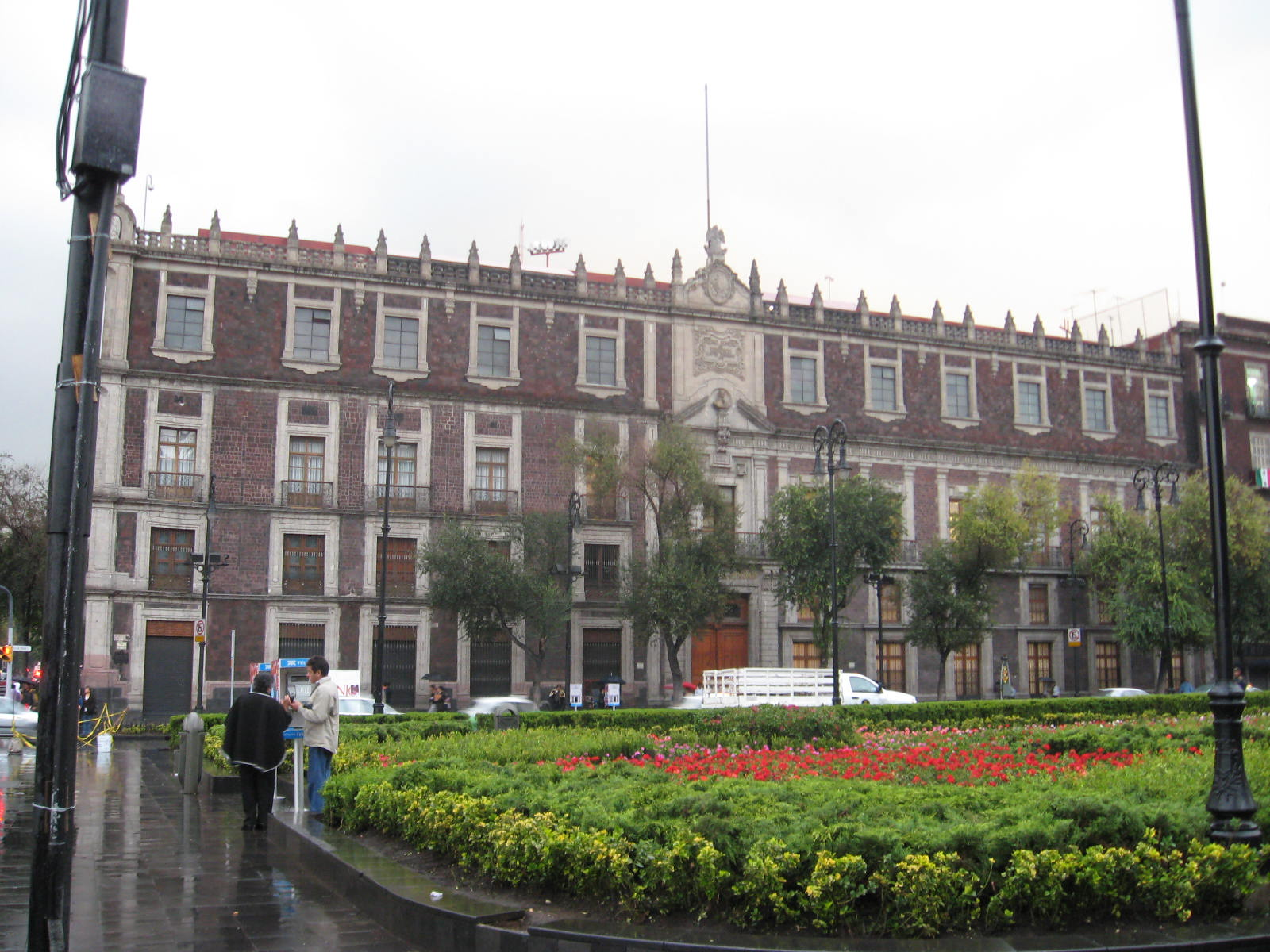
National Monte de Piedad Building off the Zócalo in Mexico City.

Pious works (obras pías) were expressions of religious belief and the wealthy in Mexico established institutions to aid the poor, sometimes with the support of the Church and the crown. The 1777 establishment of what is now called Nacional Monte de Piedad allowed urban dwellers who had any property at all to pawn access to interest-free, small-scale credit. It was established by the Count of Regla, who had made a fortune in silver mining, and the pawnshop continues to operate as a national institution in the twenty-first century, with its headquarters still right off the Zócalo in Mexico City with branches in many other places in Mexico. The Count of Regla's donation is an example of private philanthropy in the late colonial period.

A much earlier example was the endowment that conqueror Hernán Cortés gave to establish the Hospital de Jesús, which is the only venue in Mexico City that has a bust of the conqueror.

Another eighteenth-century example of private philanthropy that then became a crown institution was the Hospicio de Pobres, the Mexico City Poor House, founded in 1774 with funds of a single ecclesiastical donor, Choirmaster of the Cathedral, Fernando Ortiz Cortés, who became its first director. That institution lasted about a century, until 1871, going from a poor house or work house for adults to mainly being an orphanage for abandoned street children.

=== The clergy and Mexican independence 1810–1821 ===
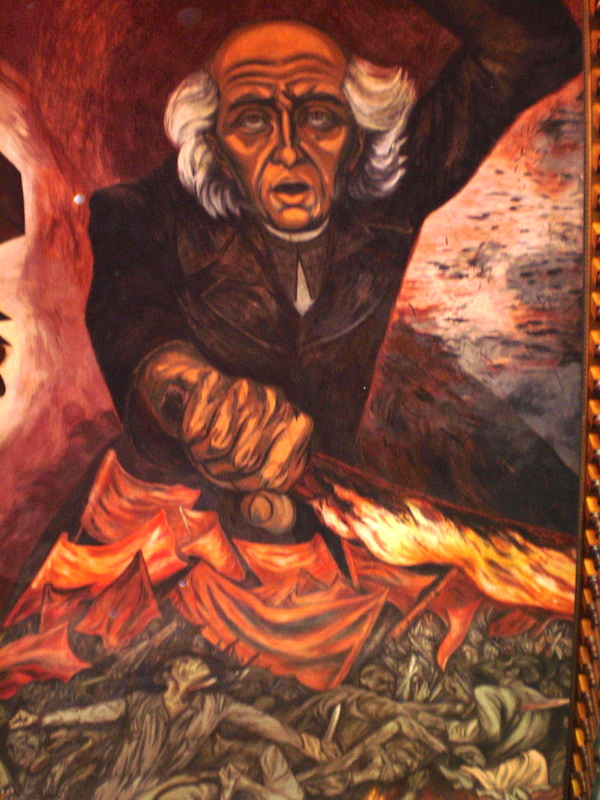
A painting of Father Miguel Hidalgo y Costilla, by José Clemente Orozco.

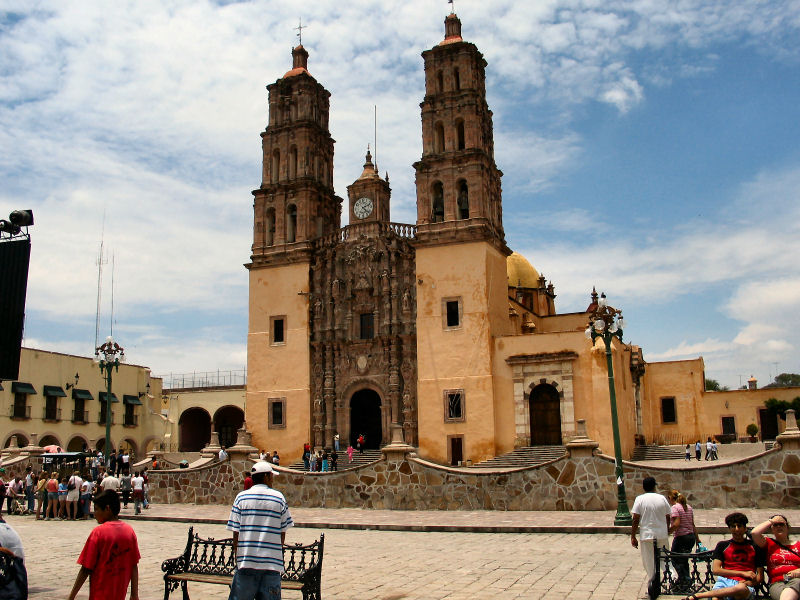
Dolores Hidalgo, where on September 16, 1810, the Independence of Mexico began.

The Bourbon Reforms had strengthened the role of the State at the expense of the Catholic Church. Parish priests and other secular clergy in particular experienced not only loss of status, but loss of income. The crown had created a new administrative regime as part of its civil reforms. In indigenous communities the parish priest, who under the Habsburgs had functioned as a representative of both the Church and the crown, was now supplanted by civil authorities. Curates could no longer use corporal punishment, manage confraternity funds, or undertake church construction projects without a license from the crown. The parish priest had often dealt with regulation of public morals, but changes in their powers meant they no longer could mete out punishment for drunkenness, gambling, adultery, or consensual unions without benefit of marriage.

This loss of power and influence in local communities contributed not only to the alienation of the lower secular clergy from the crown, but also began to dismantle the judicial state. As the crown strengthened its own civil role, it unwittingly undermined the aura of the sacred from its power, so that the monarch came to be viewed more as an oppressive authoritarian rather than a benevolent father figure. The Bourbon crown's local representatives were often military men or administrators with no reverence for the Church as an institution; no respect for the local priest, whom they sometimes insulted publicly; and no understanding of local life ways. They burst into churches during Mass to arrest Indians, "sometimes shouting obscenities and insulting the priest if he objected."

This lower secular clergy was "often accused of leading unruly protests against the acts of royal officials." When Napoleon invaded Spain in 1808, forcing the Bourbon monarch to abdicate and placing his own brother Joseph Bonaparte on the throne, there was a crisis of legitimacy of crown rule in Spain's overseas empire. Having spent decades alienating the lower clergy by its measures, the Bourbon monarchy found itself without priests supporting it, but who participated in the insurgency for independence.

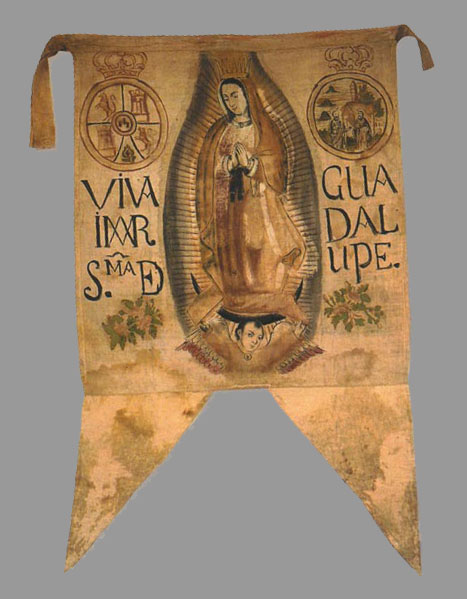
A flag carried by Miguel Hidalgo and his insurgent militia.

Two lower clerics led it, Miguel Hidalgo y Costilla and José María Morelos – national heroes in Mexico, with Mexican states named after them. Also extremely important in the struggle for independence was the symbolic role of the Virgin of Guadalupe for insurgents, but also the symbolic role of the Virgin of Los Remedios for the royalists.

The insurgency for independence in the period 1810-13 was prominently led by lower secular clerics, but the top levels of episcopal hierarchy strongly condemned it. When Hidalgo was captured by royalist forces, he was first defrocked as a priest and then turned over to civil authorities and executed. For parish priests, the Bourbon policies of the last 50 years had undermined their authority and distanced the allegiance to the monarch as the patron of the Catholic Church.

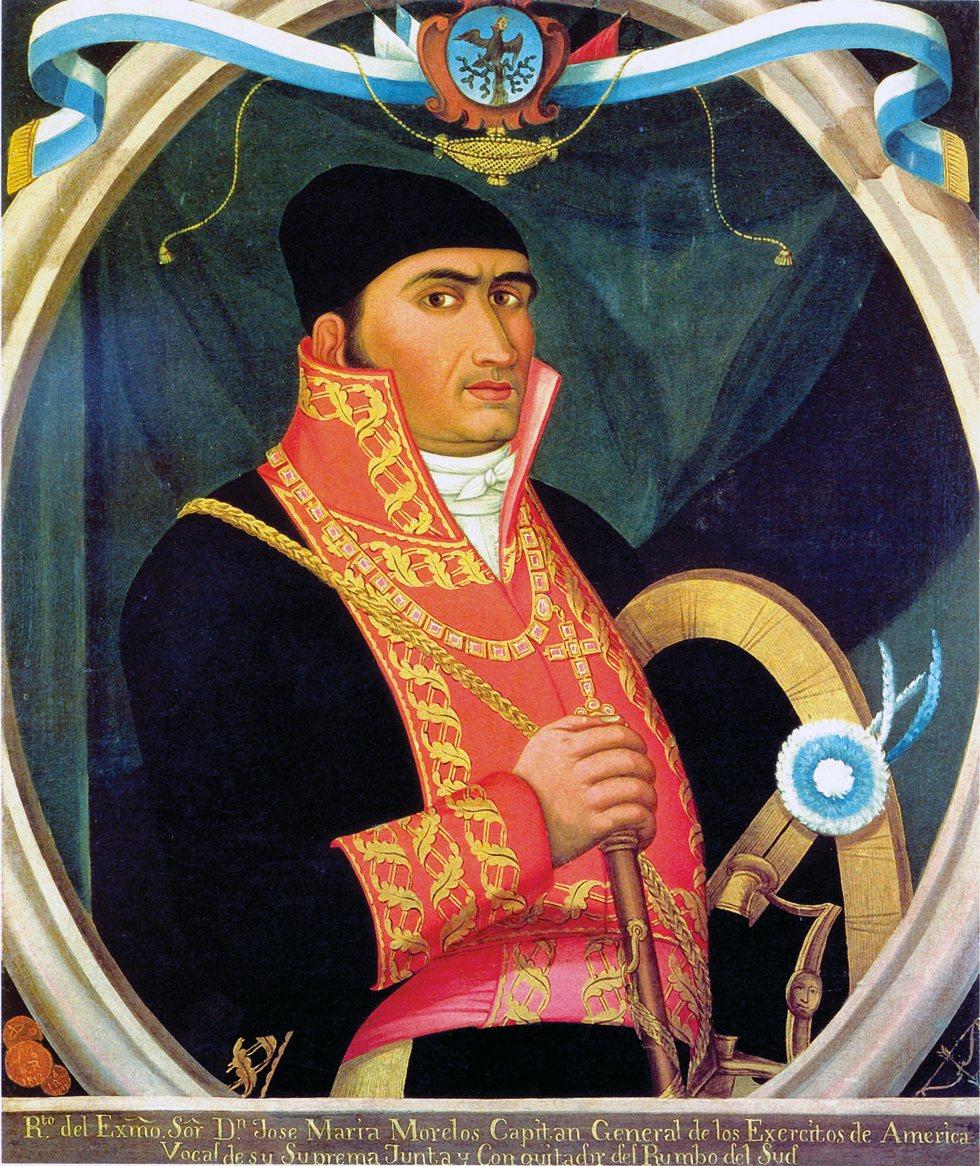
Father José María Morelos, a secular priest and leader of independence.

Events in Spain again profoundly affected politics in New Spain and on the position of the leaders of the episcopal hierarchy. Following the ouster of Napoleon, Spanish liberals created a constitution for the first time, establishing the monarch not as an absolute ruler but as a constitutional monarchy, subject to a legislature or cortes. The Spanish liberal Constitution of 1812 had many objectionable elements for the clergy in New Spain, even though it pledged in Article 12: "The religion of the Spanish nation is, and ever shall be, the Catholic Apostolic Roman and only true faith; the State shall, by wise and just laws, protect it and prevent the exercise of any other." A mere constitution could be changed and liberalism as a philosophy did not support religious institutions as such. When Ferdinand VII was restored to the throne, he promised to abide by the constitution, but quickly repudiated it, reasserting Bourbon autocratic rule. Spanish liberals pushed back and a coup of 1820 re-established the constitution.

In New Spain, the episcopal hierarchy was highly concerned, since their position would be affected. The emergence of royalist military officer Agustín de Iturbide as a champion of Mexican independence, his alliance with insurgent Vicente Guerrero, and the promulgation of the Plan of Iguala in 1821 marked a turning point for the Catholic Church. In the vision it articulated of an independent Mexico, the Plan of Iguala kept the Catholic Church as the exclusive religious institution. The hierarchy saw the Catholic Church's best interests as being with an independent Mexico where they expected to maintain their power and privileges (fueros). As nineteenth-century conservative politician and historian Lucas Alamán observed, Mexican independence "was the natural result of a simple change of front by the army, instigated by the higher clergy who were antagonistic to the Spanish Cortes [parliament] ...Independence was achieved by the very ones who had opposed it." With these assurances, the hierarchy supported independence and parish priests gave sermons in support. The Catholic Church had judged well, since it emerged "from the struggles for independence as a much stronger power than the state."

== Post-Independence Mexico, 1821-present ==
The initial period after Mexican independence was not marked by major changes in the role of the Catholic Church in Mexico, but in the mid-nineteenth century Mexican liberals initiated a reform to separate Church and State and undermine the political and economic role of the Church, codified in the Constitution of 1857. Mexican conservatives challenged those reforms and a decade of civil conflict ensued. Mexican liberals were ultimately the victors and began implementing laws passed in the late 1850s curtailing the power of the Catholic Church. The long presidency of Porfirio Díaz (1876-1911) created a modus vivendi with the Church, which ended with the outbreak of the Mexican Revolution in 1910. The revolutionary Constitution of 1917 strengthened anti-clerical laws. A new Church-State modus vivendi ensued in 1940. In 1992, the Mexican constitution was amended to remove most of the anti-clerical elements. Roman Catholicism has remained the dominant religion in Mexico since the colonial era.

== Independent Mexico in the nineteenth century ==
The nineteenth century saw initial continuity of church-state relations in Mexico, but Mexican liberals increasingly sought to curtail the power and privilege of the Roman Catholic Church. There were violent conflicts resulting from these differing views during the Liberal Reform, but during the regime of Porfirio Díaz, a new, more peaceful mode of church-state relations was in place, although the anticlerical articles of the Constitution of 1857 remained in place.

=== The First Empire and Early Republic, 1821–1854 ===
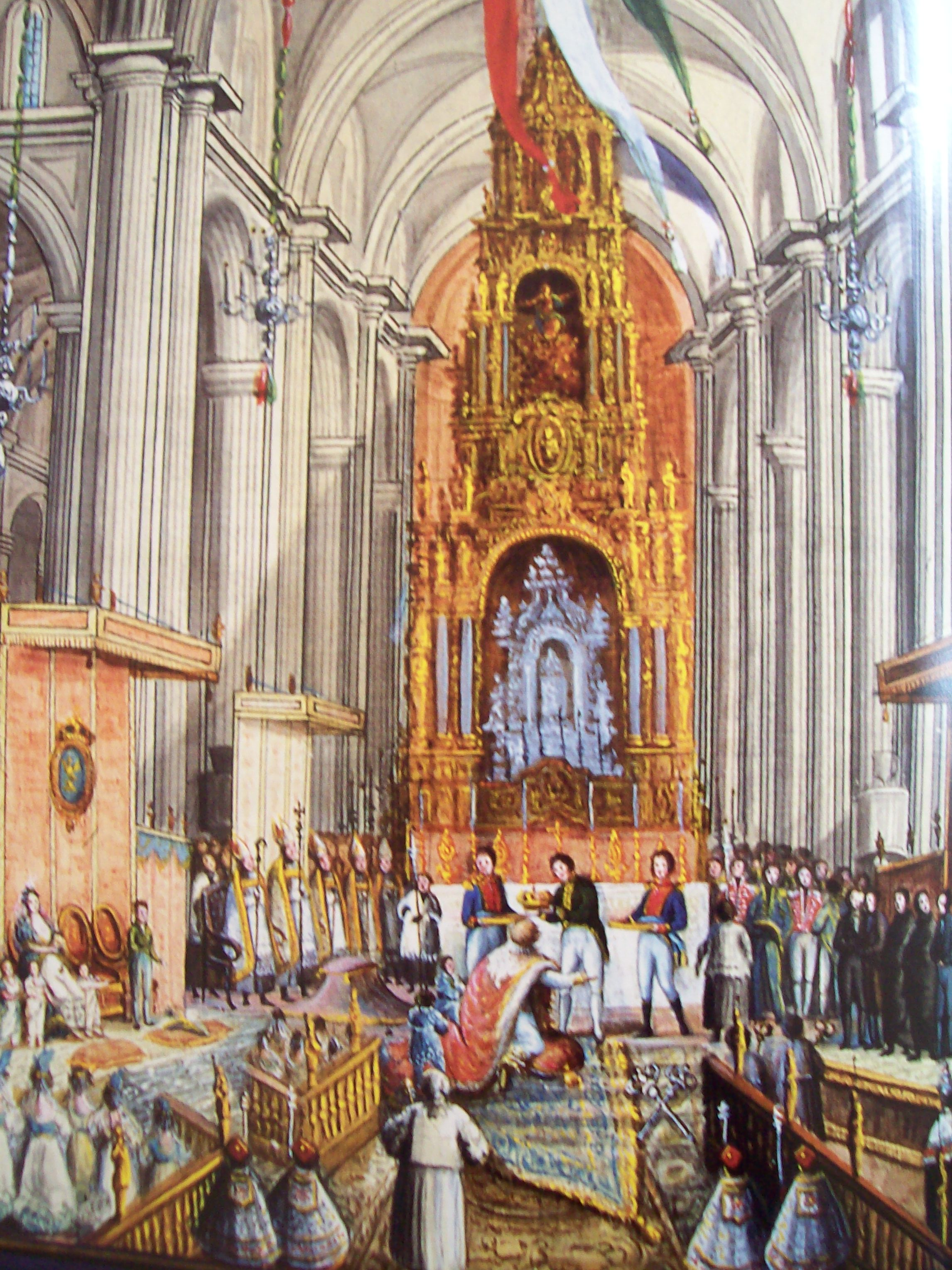
Coronation in the Mexico City cathedral of Agustín de Iturbide as emperor, 1822

The church supported Mexican independence, since the Plan of Iguala's first provision was the continuation of the existing standing and privileges of the Catholic Church. The Church played a crucial role in achieving it. In the immediate aftermath of the September 1821 fall of the Spanish royal government, a Constituent Assembly was created in February 1822 to implement the independence plan to a framework for the new sovereign state. The assembly included priests, so the interests of the Catholic Church were directly represented. Demonstrating the importance of the Catholic Church in the new order, before the assembly convened for the business of creating the governing document of the new state, all went to the cathedral to hear Mass and they took an oath to uphold the exclusivity of Catholicism in Mexico. Vicente Riva Palacio, an important, late nineteenth-century historian of Mexico and political liberal, assessed the significance, contending that "This religious ceremony indicates the supremacy of the clergy, without whose intervention in matters of policy, acts would have been illegal and all authority would have been insecure and weak."

The Plan of Iguala had provided for a European prince to rule Mexico. When none presented himself to serve as monarch, in a series of political moves the royalist-turned-insurgent Agustín Iturbide with support of the Catholic Church (and with the opposition of those favoring a republic) became Emperor Agustín I of Mexico. Although most of the peninsular-born priests supported the new order, the archbishop of Mexico resigned, immediately creating a conflict with the Vatican about which entity had the power to name a replacement. The papacy had ceded the right of appointment and other significant privileges to the Spanish crown via the Patronato Real. But now that Mexico was a sovereign state, the issue was whether that right was transferred to the new national government. This question was a major issue until the Liberal Reforma and the definitive defeat of conservatives in 1867 with the fall of the Second Mexican Empire. With the triumph of the liberals, the Catholic Church lost its exclusive standing as the only allowable religion and the Mexican State ceased to assert control over its patronage. But in the early Republic, established in 1824, the Catholic Church exerted both power and influence and sought to establish its complete independence of civil authority.

The Mexican state asserted the right of what it called the Patronato Nacional, that is the transfer of the Patronato Real with all rights and responsibilities was an essential element of political sovereignty, codified in the Constitution of 1824. The papacy countered that the Patronato reverted to the Vatican now that the political situation was transformed, and that Mexico needed to petition to receive the concession in its own right. The Vatican's position was that until that occurred, replacement of ecclesiastics reverted to the ruling hierarchy of the dioceses.

The effect of independence on the Catholic Church in Mexico and the patronage dispute meant that many dioceses lacked a bishop when one died or left Mexico, since who had the power to appoint a new one was not resolved. In Puebla, Mexico's second largest city, there was no bishop from 1829 until 1840. Even worse for many of the faithful in Mexico was the lack of parish priests, who had been important figures in local communities, despite all the Bourbon crown's efforts to undermine their authority.

=== Liberal reform of 1833 ===
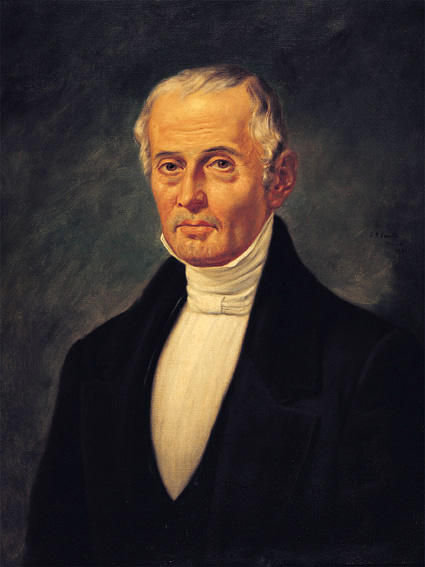
Valentín Gómez Farías implemented a series of anticlerical measures during his administration, including the secularization of missions.

Anticlericalism of Mexican liberals who opposed the institutional powers of the Catholic Church and its continued dominance in economic matters found expression when military hero Antonio López de Santa Anna was elected president in 1833 and, rather than exercising power himself, retired to his estate in Veracruz, leaving the government in the hands of his vice president, radical liberal Valentín Gómez Farías. Gómez Farías and liberals in the legislature enacted strong anticlerical measures that were a foretaste of the liberal reforms of the 1850s and 1860s. José María Luis Mora, a secular priest, was a force behind secularizing education, along with Lorenzo Zavala. The government asserted its right to appoint clerics, rather than the Church hierarchy, claiming the Patronato Nacional. Catholic missions were dissolved and their assets confiscated by the State; the educational system was secularized, which ended religious dominance in education; the State ceased collecting tithes for the support of the Catholic Church, and declared that monastic vows were no longer binding. However sweeping these reforms were, liberals did not end Catholicism as the exclusive religion of Mexico. This brief period of reform ended when a coalition of conservatives and the Mexican army forced Gómez Farías's resignation in 1834.

=== Liberal reform (1857–1861) ===
Starting in 1855, Benito Juárez issued decrees nationalizing church property, separating church and state, and suppressing religious institutes. Church properties were confiscated and basic civil and political rights were denied to religious institutes and the clergy. The Church supported the regime of Juárez's successor, Porfirio Díaz, who was opposed to land reform.

The first of the Liberal Reform Laws were passed in 1855. The Juárez Law, named after Benito Juárez, restricted clerical privileges, specifically the authority of Church courts, by subverting their authority to civil law. It was conceived of as a moderate measure, rather than abolish church courts altogether. The move opened latent divisions in the country. Archbishop Lázaro de la Garza in Mexico City condemned the Law as an attack on the Church itself, and clerics went into rebellion in the city of Puebla in 1855–56. Bishop of Michoacán Clemente de Jesús Munguía also vociferously opposed the reform laws and the requirement for Mexicans to swear fealty to the liberal Constitution of 1857. Other laws attacked the privileges (fueros) traditionally enjoyed by the military, which was significant since the military had been instrumental in putting and keeping Mexican governments in office since Emperor Agustín de Iturbide in the 1820s.

The next Reform Law was the Lerdo law, authored by Miguel Lerdo de Tejada, and enacted in 1856 but not fully enforced until 1867. Under this new law, the government began to confiscate Church land. This proved to be considerably more controversial than the Juárez Law. The purpose of the law was to convert lands held by corporate entities such as the Church into private property, favoring those who already lived on it. It was thought that such would encourage development and the government could raise revenue by taxing the process.

Lerdo de Tejada was the Minister of Finance and required that the Church sell much of its urban and rural land at reduced prices. If the Church did not comply, the government would hold public auctions. The Law also prohibited future acquisition of land by the Church. However, the Lerdo Law did not apply only to the Church. It stated that no corporate body could own land. Broadly defined, this would include ejidos, or communal land owned by Indian villages. Initially, these ejidos were exempt from the law, but eventually these Indian communities suffered an extensive loss of land.

By 1857, additional anti-clerical legislation such as the Iglesias Law (named after José María Iglesias) regulated the collection of clerical fees from the poor and prohibited clerics from charging for baptisms, marriages, or funeral services. Marriage became a civil contract, although no provision for divorce was authorized. Registry of births, marriages and deaths became a civil affair, with President Benito Juárez registering his newborn son in Veracruz. The number of religious holidays was reduced and several holidays to commemorate national events introduced. Religious celebrations outside churches, such as processions and outdoor Masses, were forbidden, use of church bells restricted, and clerical dress was prohibited in public.

One other significant Reform Law was the Law for the Nationalization of Ecclesiastical Properties, which would eventually secularize nearly all of the country's monasteries and convents. The government had hoped that this law would bring in enough revenue to secure a loan from the United States, but sales would prove disappointing from the time it was passed all the way to the early 20th century.

=== Porfiriato (1876–1911) ===
Liberal general Porfirio Díaz, who became president in 1876, strengthened the government's ties with the Catholic Church with an agreement formulated in 1905. The Church's influence over Mexico increased due to the large number of changes that occurred while Díaz was in power. These institutional reforms included: administrative reorganization, improved training of the laity, the expansion of the Catholic press, an expansion of Roman Catholic education, and the growth of the Church's influence in rural areas. The lack of enforcement of anti-clerical laws by Díaz can also be attributed to the profound influence of his wife, who was a devout Catholic.

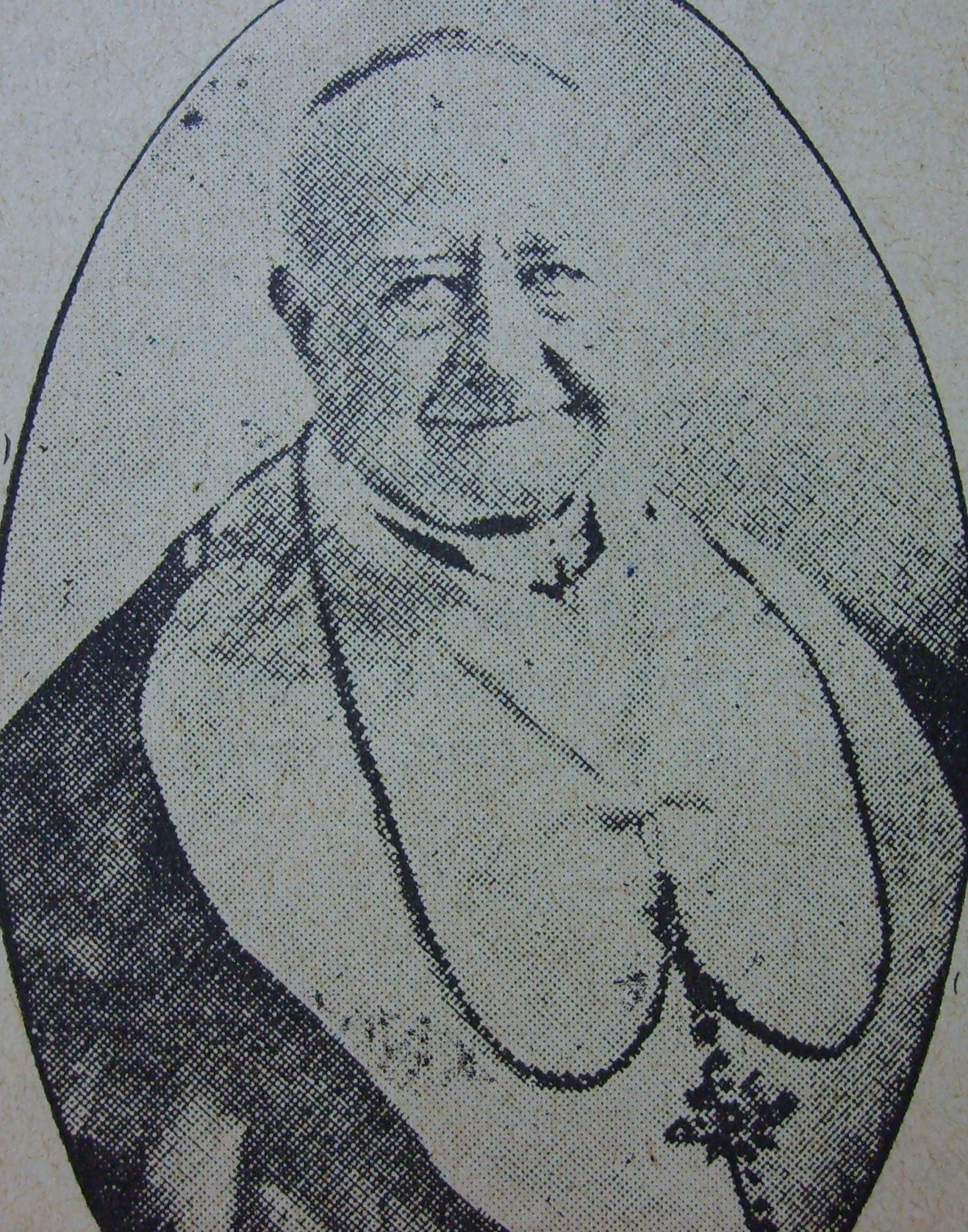
The Archbishop of Oaxaca Eulogio Gillow y Zavala of Oaxaca, who was key to the process of conciliation between Porfirio Díaz and the Catholic Church.

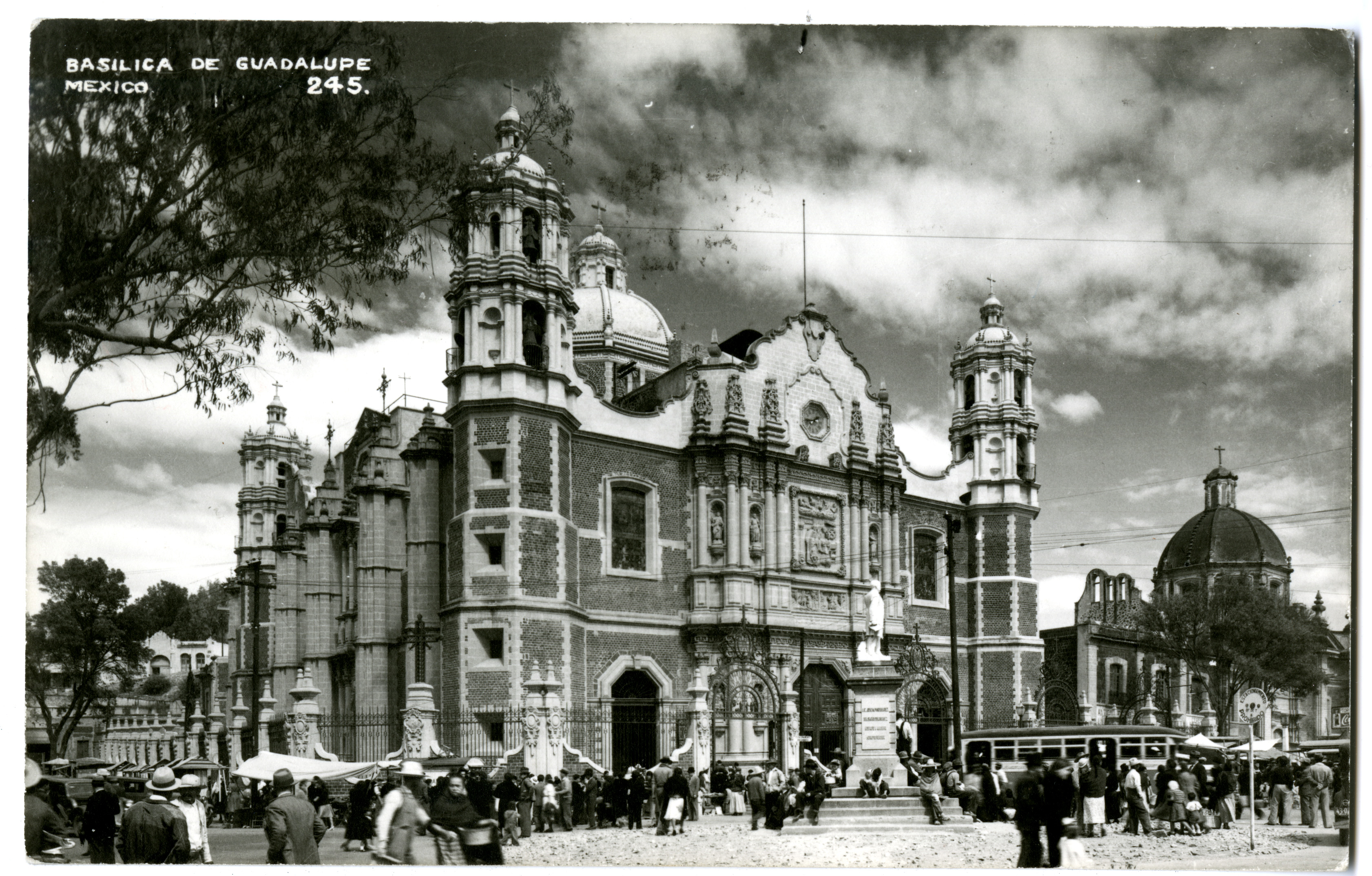
Basilica of Guadalupe Basilica. University of Dayton Libraries.

During the period 1876 to 1911, relations between the Catholic Church and the Mexican government were stable. This was a sharp contrast to the political discord that had led to outright warfare between Mexican liberals, who implemented anti-clerical laws during La Reforma (1855–1861), and conservatives, who sought continuing privileges for the Catholic Church. The War of the Reform (1858–61) ended with the defeat of conservatives. Then the liberal government of Benito Juárez defaulted on foreign loans in 1861, opening the door to foreign intervention supported by Mexican conservatives. With the fall of the Second Mexican Empire, liberal presidents Benito Juárez and, following his death, Sebastián Lerdo de Tejada implemented anti-clerical laws with even greater zeal.

By contrast Porfirio Díaz was a political pragmatist and not an ideologue, likely seeing that if the religious question were re-opened there would be renewed political discord in Mexico and possible war with the U.S. "Persecution of the Church, whether or not the clergy enters into the matter, means war, and such a war, the Government can win against its own people only through the humiliating, despotic, costly and dangerous support of the United States. Without its religion, Mexico is irretrievably lost."

When he rebelled against Lerdo, Díaz had the tacit and perhaps the explicit support of the Church. When he came to power in 1877, Díaz left the anticlerical laws in place, but the central government no longer enforced them. This modus vivendi with the Catholic Church was termed his "conciliation policy." A key player in the conciliation policy was Eulogio Gillow y Zavala, a wealthy and well-connected cleric, whom Díaz met via agricultural expositions. Gillow's appointment as archbishop of Oaxaca, Díaz's home state, and his personal relationship with Díaz, positioned him to influence church-state relations in Mexico.

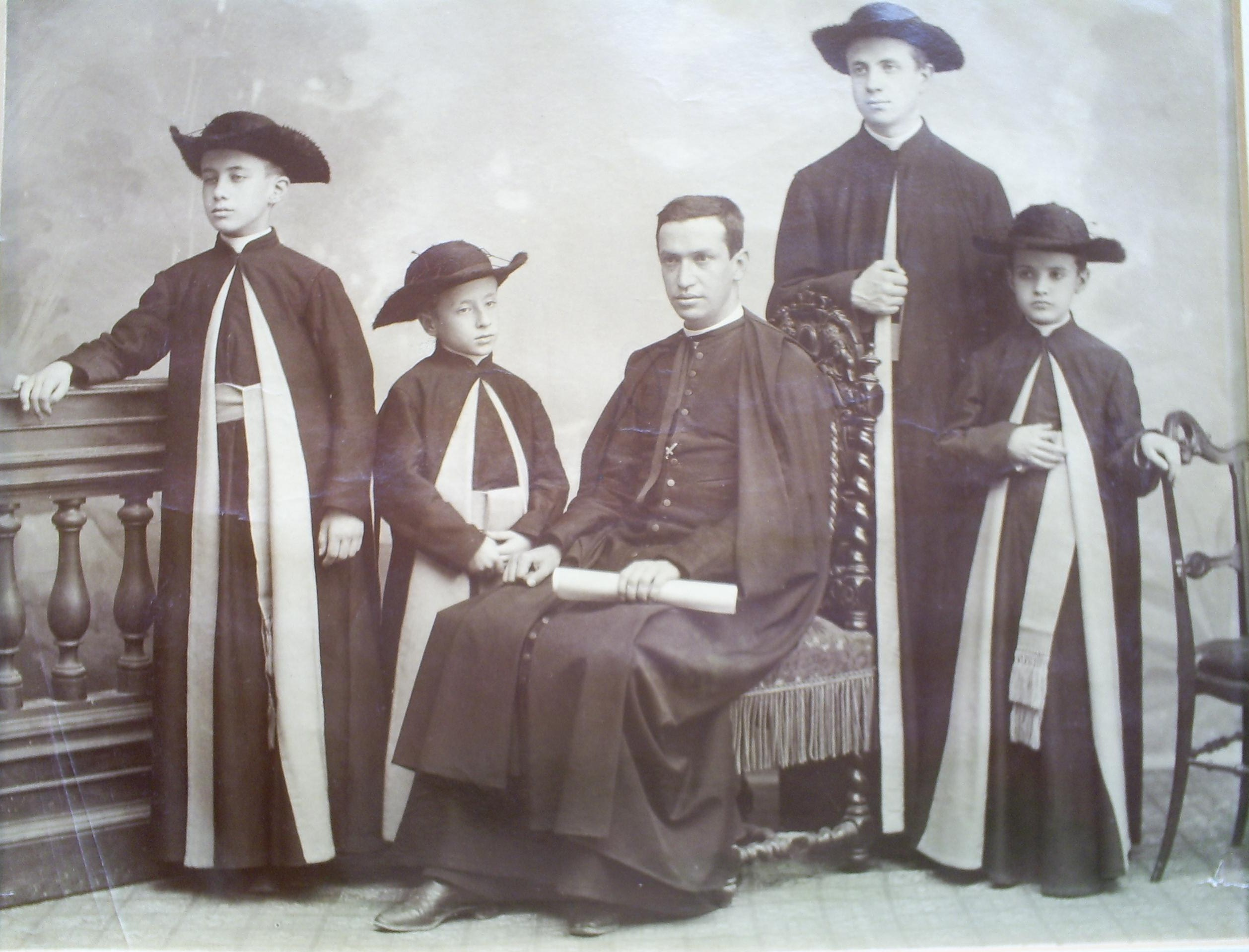
Photograph of young Mexican pilgrims in the city of Rome, all with future bright ecclesiastical careers; sitting is the future archbishop of Puebla Ramón Ibarra y González.

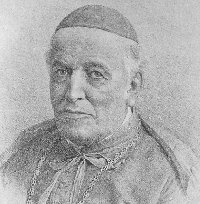
Former member of the Conservative Party, Pelagio Antonio de Labastida y Dávalos. He was an advisor to Maximilian I of Mexico during the Second Mexican Empire. Expelled by Benito Juárez, he went into exile in Zaragoza, España, and Porfirio Díaz allowed him to return to the country in 1877. He officiated at the religious marriage of Porfirio and Delfina Díaz hours before the death of the latter. Years later he maintained a friendly relationship with Porfirio Díaz, which strengthened the relationship of the Catholic Church with the Mexican State.

The conciliation policy meant that the Catholic Church regained a level of freedom of action, but one not protected by the constitution, so that their loyalty or prudence in criticism of the Diáz regime, or both, were in the Church's best interest. In a number of regions, the Church re-emerged, but others saw a less full role. Individual Mexican states in Mexico's federated republic could and did differ in their constitutions, a manifestation of Mexico's regional differences. Some states amended their constitutions to enshrine anticlerical measures of the Constitution of 1857, but ten states retained their constitutions without those amendments.

Díaz strengthened the Mexican government ties with the Catholic Church with an agreement formulated in 1905. The Church's influence in Mexico increased while Díaz was in power. These institutional reforms included: administrative reorganization, improved training of the laity, the expansion of the Catholic press, an expansion of Catholic education, and the growth of the Church's influence in rural areas. The lack of enforcement of anticlerical laws by Díaz can also be partially attributed to the profound influence of his second wife, Carmen Romero Rubio, who was a devout Catholic. She became a go-between to alert ecclesiastical establishments, such as nunneries, if anticlerical forces attempted to enforce statues against the Church.

During the late Porfiriato, the Jesuits were allowed to return to Mexico and they were to play an important role in twentieth-century political struggles in Mexico. The Catholic Church recovered economically, with intermediaries holding land and buildings for it. It also pursued charity work inspired by Catholic social doctrine. In addition, it had newspapers promoting its positions. In 1895, the Virgin of Guadalupe was crowned "Queen of Mexico", in very public ceremonies. In an apparent quid pro quo, the Fifth Provincial Council of Mexico ordered Mexican Catholics to "obey civil authority."

Despite an increasingly visible role of the Catholic Church during the Porfiriato and much better Church-State relations, the Vatican was unsuccessful in getting the reinstatement of a formal relationship with the papacy. It was not until 1992 under the presidency of Carlos Salinas de Gortari that the Holy See – Mexico relations were normalized.

== The Mexican Revolution ==
=== The end of the Porfiriato ===
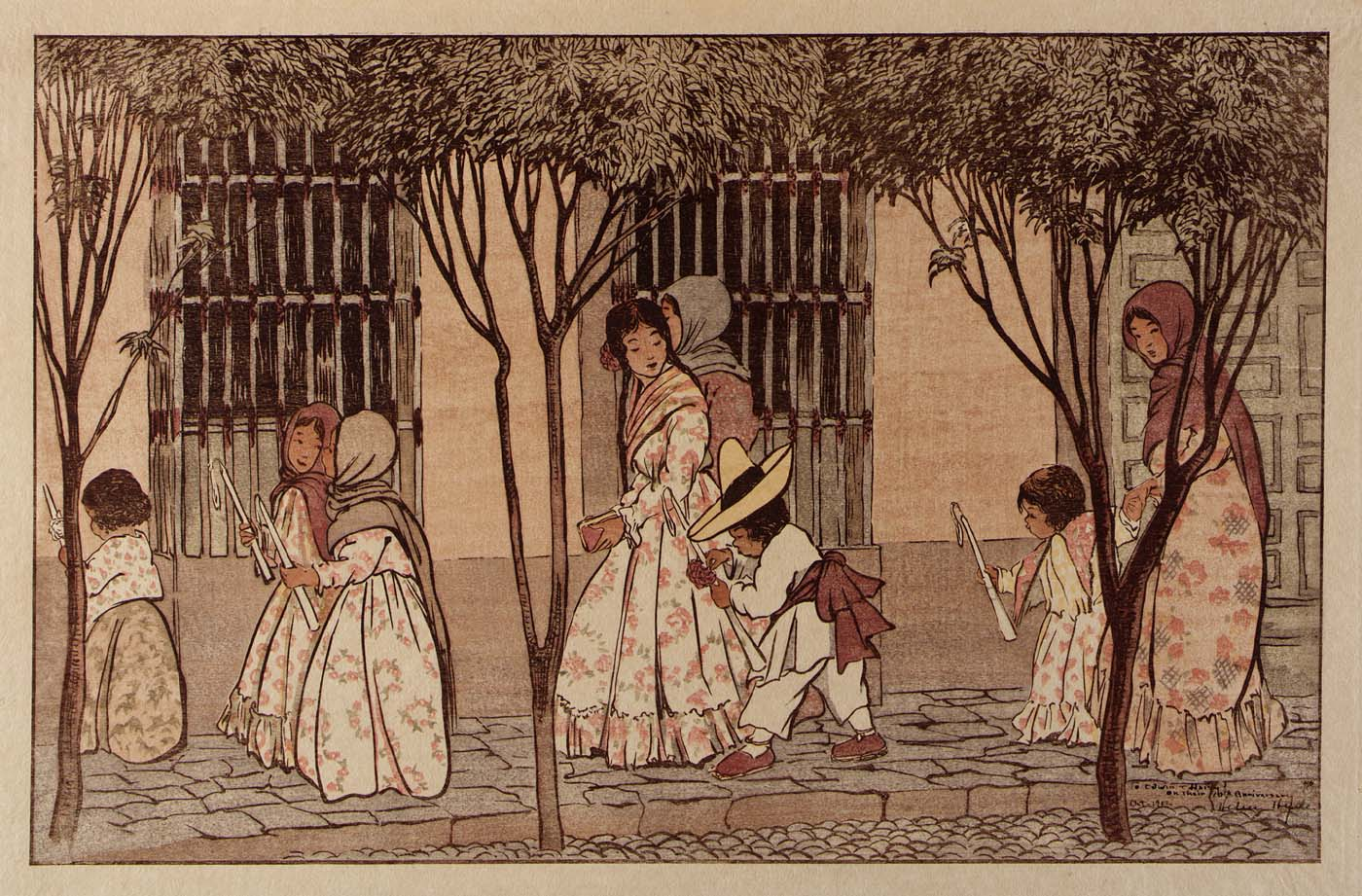
Sunday morning, Helen Hyde, 1912. The image depicts women and children on their way to church.

Although the anticlerical provisions of the liberal Constitution of 1857 theoretically remained in force, in fact, Díaz had come to a modus vivendi with the Catholic Church in the latter years of his presidency. As Díaz aged the question of presidential succession became important. Díaz ran again in 1910, despite previously saying he would not, but his initial announcement set off great political activity and the rise of Francisco Madero, a member of a rich, estate-owning family in the state of Coahuila. Anti-Díaz forces coalesced behind Madero, whom Díaz arrested and imprisoned prior to the election.

Madero escaped from jail, fled to the United States, and proclaimed the Plan of San Luis Potosí, calling for the ouster of Díaz. This was accomplished in May 1911 after a series of revolts in the north and in the state of Morelos, just 50 miles from Mexico City. With Díaz's ouster and exile, Madero was poised to take power in Mexico, but did so only after nationwide elections. The Catholic Church was already on edge about what changes might occur in this new government, perhaps particularly so since Madero himself was a follower of spiritism, and not obviously or even nominally Catholic.

=== Madero, 1911–1913 ===
Although Francisco Madero's 1910 Plan of San Luis Potosí called for the overthrow of the Díaz government, there was little in it explicitly addressing the Catholic Church or religion. However, the Church had concerns about the Plan's call for land reform, which might have affected properties held for the Church, but more alarming was the Plan's call to reform public education and expand it. Madero was not overtly anticlerical but many of his supporters were, and the Catholic Church saw the need to organize opposition. Under Madero this was possible, since as an ardent adherent of democracy, he valued the right and exercise of freedom of expression and association, including the formation of political parties.

The National Catholic Party in Mexico was organized with the support of the Church but not with its direct involvement in the interim between the exile of Díaz and the election of Madero. It advocated for "fair elections, democracy, and the application of Catholic principles (as expressed in Rerum novarum and the Catholic congresses that had met to discuss these issues)". They were accused of actively disseminating information that undermined public confidence in Madero and his policies. Even before Madero had been officially elected president, the U.S. Ambassador to Mexico wrote his superiors in Washington that "[t]he Roman Catholic Church and the party that takes its name have become violently antagonistic to Madero, and are busily engaged through the Republic in criticizing his motives, decrying his policies, and censuring the weakness and vacillation which is supposed to characterize his direction of affairs." Madero was elected in a landslide and took the oath of office, despite the National Catholic Party's attempt to undermine his popularity.

As a political novice who had never held office before becoming president, Madero found governing Mexico extremely challenging. In supporting freedom of the press, the Mexican press was ruthless in its criticisms of Madero. In supporting the formation of unions, unions struck and made life difficult for city dwellers. Peasants saw his inaction on land reform as a betrayal, and in Morelos Emiliano Zapata drew up the Plan of Ayala in opposition. There were revolts by former supporters, such as Pascual Orozco, suppressed by General Victoriano Huerta, who was a senior general under Díaz that Madero relied upon, having dismissed the revolutionary fighters who helped bring him to power, keeping the Federal Army. They were loyal to Madero right up to the point when they fomented a successful coup against him in February 1913.

=== Huerta, 1913–14 ===
The Federal Army, the Catholic hierarchy, and the National Catholic Party, along with supporters of the Porfirian order and international investors, as well as the government of the United States, supported the coup against Madero and his vice president, though their assassination was not necessarily anticipated. General Huerta became head of state, vowing to restore the Porfirian order, in what many have called a reactionary government. Catholic support was not uniform, however, with some objecting to the coup that ended Mexico's experiment in democracy. However, the Church as an institution chose the losing side when it opted for Huerta. "Catholics seemingly feared radicalism more than they feared dictatorship," in the view of one historian.

Madero as a martyr to democracy did what he was unable to do since his election, that is, bring together disparate forces into action against Huerta's government, while the National Catholic Party and the clergy stood with it. When Huerta was ousted in 1914, the Catholic Church and the National Catholic Party suffered the consequences of its support of his government.

=== The Constitutionalists ===
The main faction in the north of Mexico was Constitutionalists, led by the governor of Coahuila and formerly part of the Díaz government, Venustiano Carranza. The Constitutionalists took their name from their support of the liberal Constitution of 1857, deeming the Huerta government illegitimate. Because the Catholic Church and the National Catholic Party had supported Huerta, they were a target of the liberal Constitutionalists. As with liberals in the nineteenth century who sought to reduce the Catholic Church's power, the Constitutionalist were not necessarily anti-Catholic or atheists. As one scholar assessed the Constitutionalists’ position, "there seems to be no reason to reject the protestations of Mexican officials that the reform was not aimed at the Church in its spiritual sphere, but at the clergy in their temporal activities." Carranza himself was staunchly anticlerical. During the Constitutionalist struggle against Huerta as early October 1913, following the February Huerta coup, Carranza was clearly planning on strictly enforcing the Laws of the Reforma, which had been ignored in the later Díaz regime, though not repealed. The Constitutionalist targeting of clergy, churches, and sacred objects was likely no surprise. In areas controlled by the Constitutionalists, there was tremendous violence against church property and holy objects, including the smashing of religious statues and stabling horses in churches. The practice was defended by a Constitutionalist general, who said it was "for the deliberate purpose of showing the Indians that lightning would not strike – that the Constitutionalists were not the enemies of God as the priests told them." The Constitutionalists’ best general, Alvaro Obregón, took anticlerical measures when he entered Mexico City in triumph, imposing a fine of 500,000 pesos on the Church to be paid to the Revolutionary Council for Aid to the People. He also jailed and expelled nearly 200 clerics in Mexico City.

=== Zapatistas and religion ===
Venustiano Carranza assumed the presidency on May 1, 1915, but the country was not at peace. Emiliano Zapata and peasants in Morelos continued fighting against the central government. The differences between the revolutionaries of northern Mexico and those in the center and south were significant and made the conflict regional. Those fighting in Morelos were peasants seeking the return of their lands. Rather than armies of movement, as in the north of Mexico, the fighters were guerrillas.

A significant difference between the Zapatistas and the Constitutionalists was cultural, since the Zapatistas fought under the banner of the Virgin of Guadalupe and often had a picture of her or other saints on their big hats "to protect them". Many leftist intellectuals and northern Constitutionalists disdained the Zapatistas as too Indian, too Catholic, the embodiment of traditional Mexico that the liberals sought to transform and modernize. In Morelos, priests were not persecuted, and some actively supported the guerrilla struggle. The priest in Cuautla typed the first copy of the Plan of Ayala; a priest gave Zapata his beautiful horse for the war. In Tepoztlán, the priest translated Nahuatl documents from Zapata's home community of Anenecuilco. Alvaro Obregón organized urban workers in "Red Battalions" to go to Morelos to fight the Zapatistas as well as the followers of Pancho Villa in the north. The Zapatistas have the distinction of opposing every government from Díaz to Madero to Huerta to Carranza for failing to protect and restore their lands to them. Carranza's solution to the problem was to arrange Zapata's assassination in 1919, effectively ending the struggle in Morelos against the central government.

== Church-State relations, 1917–1940 ==
The revolutionary faction that won the Mexican Revolution began to consolidate power after 1917. The Constitution of 1917 strengthened the State's power against the Church. For the first two presidents, Venustiano Carranza (1915–1920) and Álvaro Obregón (1920–24), the State could have rigorously enforced anticlerical provisions, but there were many pressing issues to deal with in consolidating power and likely they were unwilling to provoke conflict with the Church at this juncture. Under President Calles (1924–28), and continued dominance in power when he ruled as Maximum Chief, there was extreme Church-State conflict. Calles was determined to enforce the anticlerical articles of the Constitution. The conflict was ended by mediation in 1929. Under the presidency of Lázaro Cárdenas (1934–40) there was less conflict. With his successor, Manuel Ávila Camacho (1940–1946), Church-State relations entered a new period of conciliation, similar to the Porfiriato.

=== 1917 Mexican Constitution ===
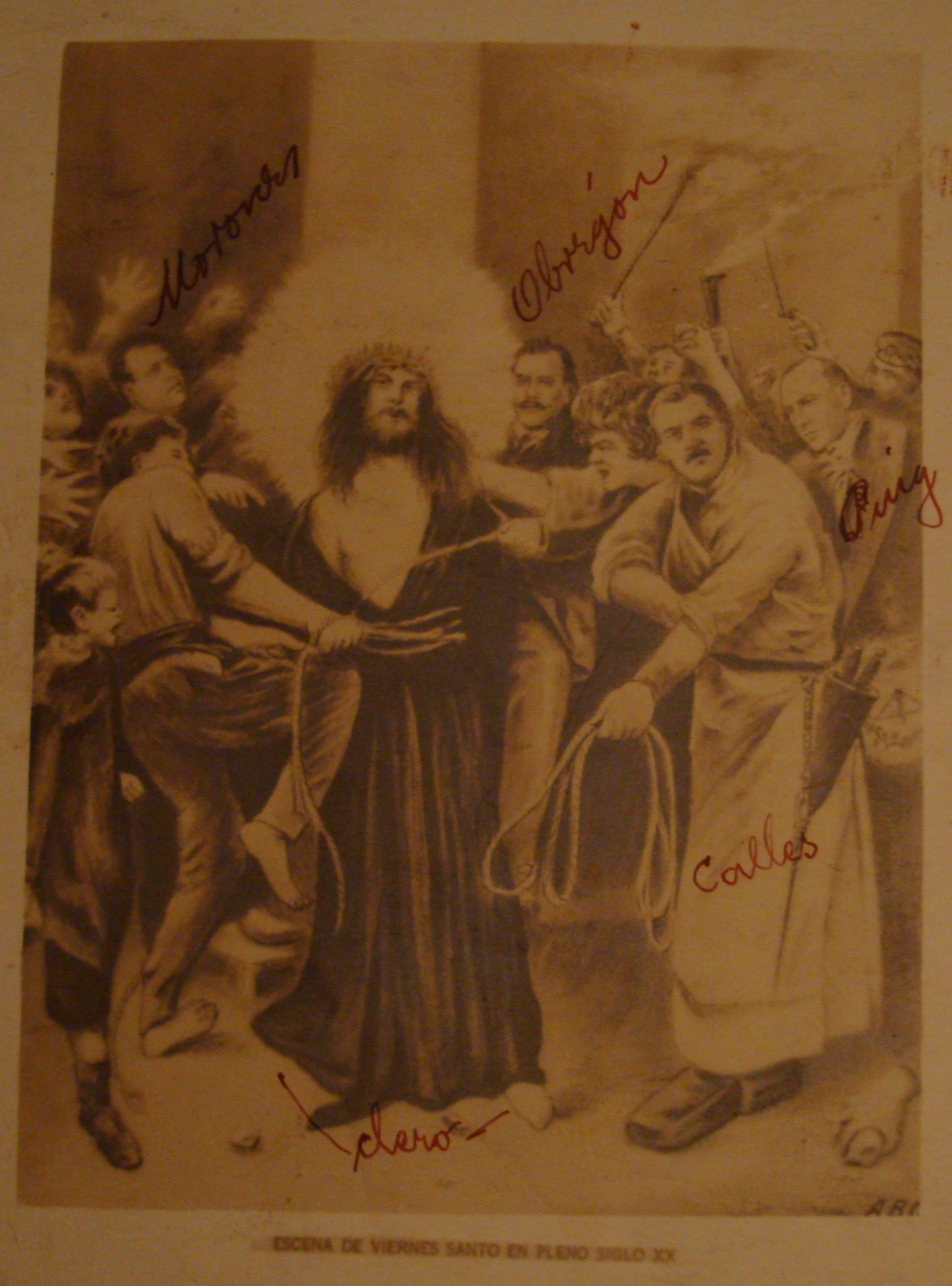
"Good Friday scene in the midst of the 20th century", from the archive of the Mexican priest Jesús María Rodríguez, showing Alvaro Obregón, Plutarco Elías Calles and Luis Morones of the labor organization CROM persecuting Christ.

The 1917 Mexican Constitution included many anti-clerical elements. Five elements in this Constitution were aimed at reducing the Catholic Church's influence in Mexican domestic affairs. Article 3 enforced secular education in Mexican schools. Monastic vows and orders were outlawed in Article 5. Article 24 prevented public worship outside the confines of the Church buildings. According to article 27, religious institutions were denied the right to acquire, hold, or administer real property. Furthermore, all real estate held by religious institutions through third parties, like hospitals and schools, was declared national property. Finally in article 130, it declared all basic civil responsibilities like voting or commenting on public affairs was taken away from Church officials. But Article 130's most important legal power against the Church was that it declared the State the final arbiter of public religious worship, including the power to limit the number of priests and requiring priests to register with the government as "professionals". Mexican bishops protested the articles from their exile in Texas and continued to object to the anticlerical articles in subsequent years. The Mexican government was firm in their attempt to eliminate the Catholic Church's legal existence in Mexico, but that led to decades-long conflict between Church and State. The Church immediately rejected the constitution and "call[ed] on Catholics to fight for its abolition." The constitution did not ban the Church as an institution, or prevent Mexicans from practicing Catholicism, but it forced some Catholics into a dilemma of respecting civil law or their conscience when the government enforced the anticlerical laws the 1920s. Some Catholics took up arms against the government.

=== Anticlericalism of Calles and violent church-state conflict 1926–1929 ===
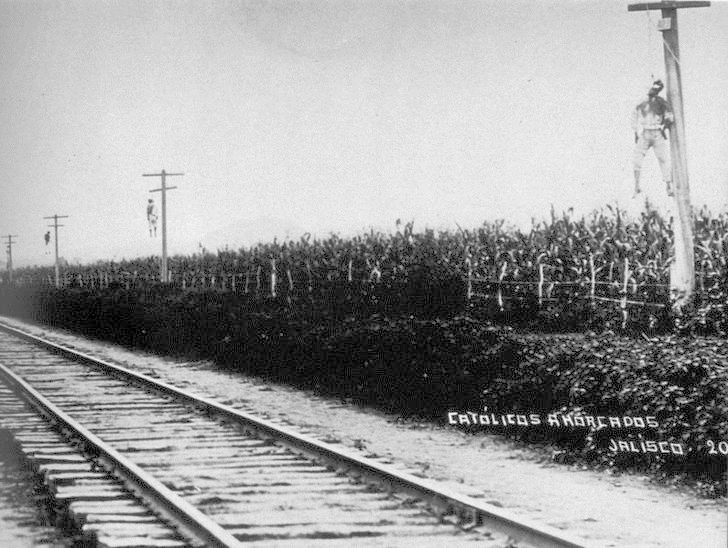
Government forces publicly hanged Cristeros on main thoroughfares throughout Mexico, including in the Pacific states of Colima and Jalisco, where bodies would often remain hanging for extended lengths of time.

When Northern caudillo Plutarco Elías Calles was elected president in 1924, he was determined to enforce the constitutional provisions on religion. Calles was a known anticlerical, more fanatical in his ideology than many other Constitutionalists, perhaps because he felt the sting of his status as a natural son of parents who had not married in the Church, nor had they bothered to baptize him; his father had abandoned him and his mother died when he was three. Some scholars view his illegitimacy as fundamentally shaping his attitude toward religion and the Catholic Church.

His Sonoran origins also likely played a factor in his stance against the Catholic Church, since the North was far less traditionally Catholic than what some called "Old Mexico", the Center and South, with large indigenous populations, many large sized cities, and a strong Church presence dating from the sixteenth century. In the North there were vast spaces with few cities or towns and an indigenous population that was largely nomadic and converted to Christianity via the few missions established in the region. Also not to be discounted is the influence of the United States, a largely Protestant country but with separation of Church and State, and the efforts of mainline, U.S.-based Protestants in northern Mexico, who in the nineteenth century saw Mexico as a country ripe for the message of Protestant missionaries. A small but significant number of Protestants participated in the Mexican Revolution and they saw the diminution of the power of the Catholic Church aiding their own cause.

In June 1926, Calles enacted a decree often referred to as "Calles Law." Under this provision, Article 130 of the 1917 Mexican Constitution was to be enforced. Catholic Church officials were not only alarmed by the suddenness of Calles's decision, but also by the profound shift in Church-State interactions.

The crux of the conflict for the Church hierarchy was the assertion of State power over the autonomy of the Church in personnel matters. The State decreed the compulsory registration of the clergy and thereby put priests under the authority of the State rather than the Catholic hierarchy. The State could and did limit the number and nationality of clergy permitted in the country. Foreign priests were denied licenses. Although the Church had seminaries in Mexico that trained priests for placement in Mexico, there were many foreign priests, particularly from Spain, who were excluded from Mexico on nationalist grounds. In theory the State could have approved Mexican priests who were unacceptable to the Catholic hierarchy.

By enforcing regulations that deemed priests as professionals like doctors or lawyers, the State asserted its power to control the institution but it also challenged the Church's function in the spiritual sphere. The Church had already ceased to contest the constitutional restrictions on its holding real property, forcing the sale of its landed estates during the liberal Reforma. Nineteenth-century liberal priests, such as José María Luis Mora, and conservative intellectual and politician Lucas Alamán, supported the diminution of Church power in the economic sphere, but not the spiritual sphere.

The suppression of the Church included the closing of many churches and the killing or forced marriage of priests. The persecution was most severe in Tabasco under the atheist governor Tomás Garrido Canabal. Events relating to this were famously portrayed in the novel The Power and the Glory by Graham Greene.

A modern reproduction of the flag used by the Cristeros with references to "Viva Cristo Rey" and "Nuestra Señora de Guadalupe".

In 1926, the Church hierarchy declared what was in essence a clerical strike, ceasing to say Mass or administer the sacraments. For the Mexican faithful, the suspension of the sacraments brought the Church-State conflict into their daily lives. The episcopal hierarchy supported boycotts on businesses, petitioned the government to not implement the proposed changes, and used other peaceful means of persuading and pressuring the State. Those who took up arms in the Cristero Rebellion did not receive the support of the Mexican Catholic hierarchy. In Michoacan, Archbishop Leopoldo Ruiz y Flóres refused to support the revolt and was accused of cowardliness and even freemasonry. However, the archbishop has been seen as being "guided by a keener appreciation of the ultimate realities of power than were those adamant clerics who pressed the Church to engage in mortal combat." When the Church-State negotiations resulted in the Arreglos that did not change the anticlerical articles of the constitution but did result in a modus vivendi similar to that in the Porfiriato, Archbishop Ruiz y Flores supported them.

Even though Archbishop Ruiz did not support the Cristeros’ resort to violence, he did advocate a response that profoundly affected the relations between the hierarchy and the laity. Since priests were the target of State action and since church buildings were no longer available for celebration of the sacraments, the archbishop enacted practices that in many ways harkened back to the early Church, with a more empowered laity and decentralized, secret worship, often in people's homes. Lay women in some cases became religious leaders in their communities, leading the liturgy of worship but in the absence of a priest, there was no communion. Catholics were urged to strengthen their inner faith, but for those who engaged in violent action what they wanted was the Church's blessing. As a long-term strategy, the archbishop put confidence in the survival of the faith, despite the political assault by the Mexican state. For most in rural Mexico, religion was an integral way of being, what urban secular Mexicans considered the "superstition" of backward peasants and a key reason that attacks on the Catholic Church as an institution were necessary to modernize Mexico.

=== Catholic lay organizations ===
For the Catholic laity, the restrictions on their ability to exercise freedom of worship in public settings and the closure of churches in their communities may have had greater resonance than the matter of State regulation of the clergy. Community celebrations of their patron saint, processions, pilgrimage to religious sites, and other visible manifestations of religious belief undermined the essence of many rural communities. The absence of a priest to baptize children, prepare Catholics for confirmation, hear confession, perform marriages, and administer the last rites of Extreme Unction before death, meant that the rhythm of the sacramental life cycle for individuals and their families as well as their larger community was being suppressed. Lay organizations became important during the crisis, a strategy of the hierarchy to strengthen Catholic resistance without the hierarchy's direct intervention, But there is also evidence of widespread lay Catholic desire to passively resist the anticlerical measures, as opposed to the active and often violent resistance of the Cristero fighters.

A coalition of urban groups was brought together under the umbrella of the National League for the Defense of Religious Liberty, created in 1925, in the early part of Calles's presidential term, but prior to the 1926 promulgation of the Calles Law that same year. The Mexico City-based organization was created by former members of the short-lived National Catholic Party (Partido Católico Nacional); the Union of Mexican Catholic Ladies (Unión de Damas Católicas Mexicanas); a Catholic student organization, the Jesuit-led Catholic Association of Mexican Youth (Asociación Católica de la Juventud Mexicana, ACJM); the Knights of Columbus; the National Parents' Association; and the National Catholic Labor Confederation. The League had by June of its founding year 1925 about 36,000 members and chapters in almost every state of the country.

=== Catholic women and the church-state crisis ===
In 1912, Catholic women had organized themselves in Mexico City into the Union of Mexican Catholic Ladies (Unión de Damas Católicas Mexicanas, UDCM), "as a nonpolitical lay organization dedicated to re-Catholicizing Mexican society." Their work during the military phase of the Mexican Revolution (1910–17) had been more in the social realm rather than the political, attempting to aid the urban poor who had suffered under Porfirio Díaz's economic policies. These Mexican elite women were responding to the 1891 papal encyclical Rerum novarum for Catholic activism on behalf of the poor and working class against the new challenge of industrialization and capitalism. Their aid of the poor was an extension of their family role as Catholic nurturers and educators in the domestic sphere.

Both lay and religious women also performed valuable services to the Catholic community in a less formalized fashion. They took leadership roles during the unsettled times that made priests the target of regulation and persecution, as an extraordinary measure, but that empowerment has been seen to have affected the emergence of different roles for Catholic women in the twentieth century.

=== End of the Cristero War, 1929 ===
After three years’ of widespread violence (1926–1929), the U.S. brokered an agreement (Arreglos) that can be seen as an armistice between Church and State, since the anticlerical constitutional articles remained in force, but the Arreglos brought the conflict to an end. Brokered by the U.S. Ambassador to Mexico, Dwight W. Morrow, Calles and the Mexican Catholic hierarchy came to an agreement that left the anticlerical elements of the Constitution of 1917 in place, but brought an end to the conflict. Many Cristero fighters and supporters of the Church saw the hierarchy's settlement as "cowardly" and selling out the Church. However, it has been argued that the long-term interests of the Church were forwarded by coming to the settlement given that the State had backed away from its enforcement of the anticlerical articles of the Constitution.

=== Cristero saints ===
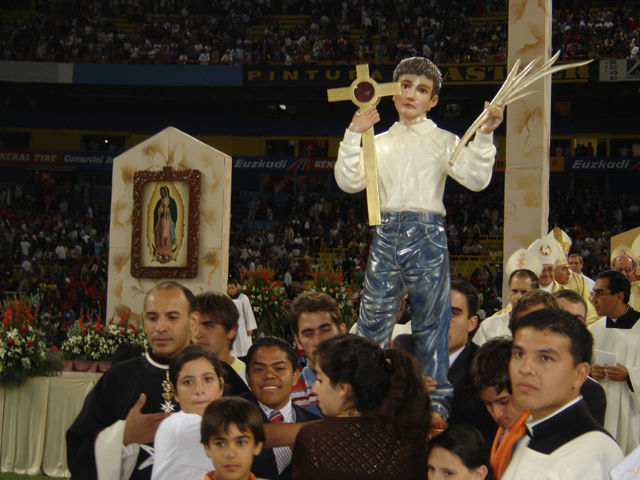
Beatification of José Sánchez del Río in the stadium of Guadalajara, Mexico.

Although the Church hierarchy at the time did not support Cristero violence, it did recognize some of those who died fighting for religious rights in Mexico. In September 1988 the Vatican beatified Father Miguel Pro, who had been summarily executed in crucifix posture; further beatifications and some canonizations occurred in 2000 and 2005, considered Saints of the Cristero War. This recognition can be considered in the context of Mexican national politics. In the July 1988 presidential elections, the Institutional Revolutionary Party, which had evolved from the party Calles had founded in 1929, was elected by the narrowest of margins and by fraudulent means. President Carlos Salinas de Gortari announced in his December 1988 inaugural address that he would "modernize" Mexico and led the process to change the Mexican constitution, including most of its anticlerical provisions, that was passed in 1992. By 2000, the Vatican likely perceived no danger in recognizing Catholics who had participated in the conflict.

=== Impact of the War ===
The effects of the war on the Church were profound. Between 1926 and 1934 at least 40 priests were killed. There were 4,500 priests serving the people before the rebellion, but by 1934 there were only 334 priests licensed by the government to serve fifteen million people. The rest had been eliminated by emigration, expulsion and assassination. By 1935, 17 states had no priest at all.

=== Cárdenas, 1934-40 ===
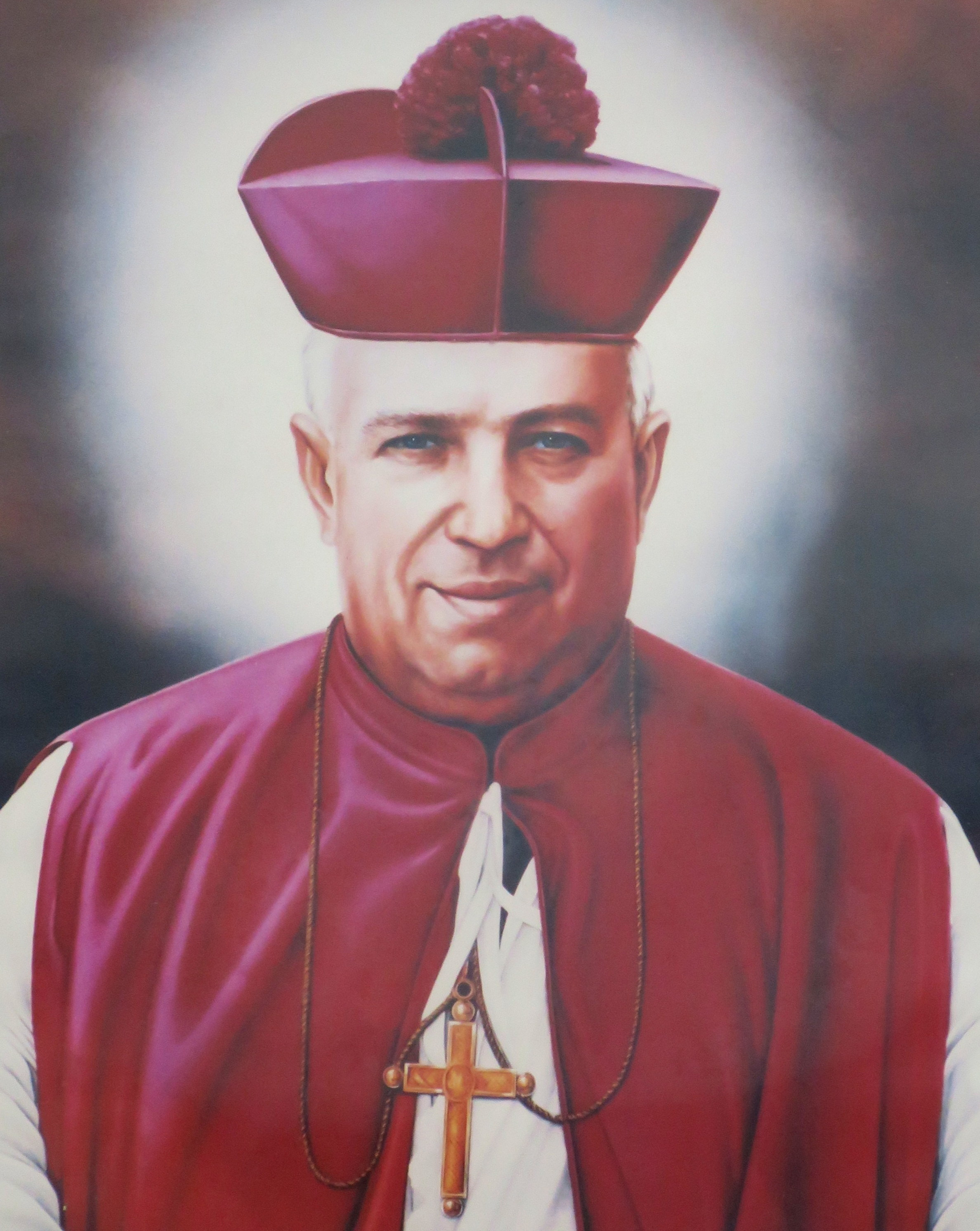
Rafael Guízar y Valencia was driven out of his diocese and forced to live the remainder of his life in hiding in Mexico City.

By the time Lázaro Cárdenas was elected president of Mexico in 1934, the Mexican government had backed away from its enforcement of many of the anticlerical articles of the constitution. However the articles and enforcing statutes remained on the books. In the midst of the Great Depression, it seemed prudent to deal with matters other than the role of the Catholic Church in Mexican life. Although Cárdenas was elected, Calles doubtless expected to continue to be the actual power behind the presidency during the period of the Maximato. Cárdenas accepted the political platform of the new PNR as his own, campaigned on it, and his first cabinet was essentially chosen by Calles. So there was the potential for continued Church-State conflict. The Church-State situation began deteriorating. In 1935, the government nationalized every Church building used in any way to forward its mission, including private homes that had been used for religious services ("house churches") or for religious schools, as well as bookstores selling religious books.

A less confrontational policy of the government was its encouragement of Protestant missionaries in Mexico, in an attempt to create religious competition and undermine the power of the Catholic Church. Cárdenas welcomed the benignly named Summer Institute of Linguistics (SIL) in 1936, a division of the Wycliffe Bible Translators whose linguists translated the Bible into a plethora of languages. The SIL began work in southern Mexico, a region of large indigenous populations with strong religious traditions, where the SIL produced Bibles in indigenous languages. From this small group, Protestantism in Mexico began to spread.

In 1936, rather than Church-State relations going from bad to worse, Cárdenas changed the government's approach to one of conciliation. He said "The government will not commit the error of previous administrations by considering the religious question as a problem of preeminence to other issues involved in the national program. Antireligious campaigns would only result in further resistance and definitely postpone economic revival." This was a major policy change in Mexico, but it is also significant that it was reported in the New York Times. The implementation of the policy was marked by statements of the Secretary of the Interior (Gobernación) that religious liberty and freedom of conscience would be respected and that the government would not provoke conflict with the Church. These were also reported in the New York Times.

There were changes in the Church hierarchy during this period, with the death of Archbishop of Mexico Díaz and the resignation of the Apostolic Delegate Archbishop Ruiz y Flores, both of whom had played decisive roles during the height of Church-State conflict under Calles. The Vatican appointed Luis María Martínez as Archbishop of Mexico, who was considered "a realist who believed in moderation in the defense of the Church's rights and interests."

The change in government policy and the new leader of Mexico's Church hierarchy implementing a policy of flexibility with the government, resulted in an effective policy of conciliation. For Cárdenas, this new relationship meant that when he nationalized oil in March 1938, the Church not only supported Cárdenas's move, but Cárdenas also publicly acknowledged the Church's cooperation a month later.

=== Government-mandated socialist education and Catholic pushback ===
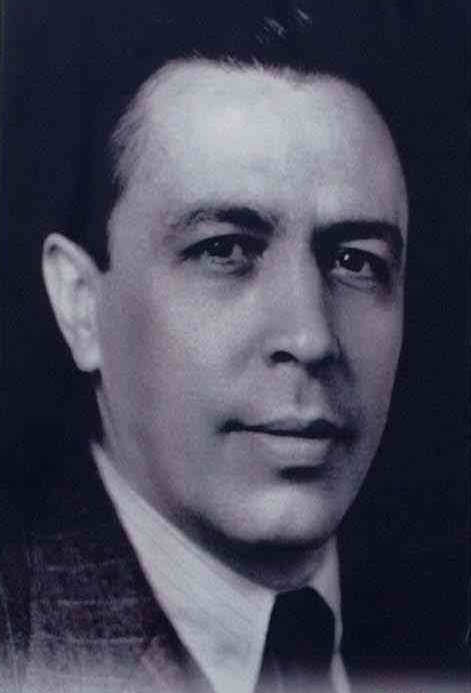
Manuel Gómez Morín, former rector of UNAM and founder of the National Action Party (Mexico)

Earlier in the 1930s, the Mexican government under Cárdenas attempted to impose socialist education, emphasizing Marxist thought including the idea of class conflict. This imposition of a particular ideology was destabilizing in Mexico, which had just experienced the religious crisis of the 1920s, and mobilized an array of middle class opponents, including Catholics. At the National Autonomous University of Mexico (UNAM), the Jesuit-founded Unión Nacional de Estudiantes Católicos (UNEC – National Union of Catholic Students) founded in 1931 mobilized to resist the government's push. The rector of UNAM, Manuel Gómez Morín, who had held other posts in post-revolution Mexico, was concerned about the government's attack on academic freedom and freedom of thought. Gómez Morín encountered in UNEC the leaders who successfully thwarted implementation of socialist education at UNAM. This alliance between Gómez Morín and UNEC had enduring consequences, becoming the foundation for the creation of the National Action Party of Mexico (PAN), in 1939. Although not directly connected to the Catholic hierarchy, the PAN was an independent, pro-democratic, nonviolent, opposition political party with many Catholic members.

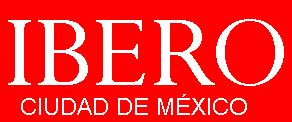
Logo for the Universidad Iberoamericana

Two Catholic universities were founded to give Catholic students an alternative to socialist education at public universities. The Universidad Autónoma de Guadalajara was founded in 1935 and the Universidad Iberoamericana was founded in Mexico City in 1943. The university in Guadalajara was established during the presidency of Lázaro Cárdenas, when church-state tensions were still quite evident. The establishment of the Universidad Iberoamericana was facilitated by the rector of UNAM, Rodolfo Brito Foucher, who along with many academics saw the imposition of socialist education as an infringement on academic freedom. Brito Foucher was a lawyer and had headed UNAM's faculty of law. In his reading of the Constitution of 1917 on the restrictions on the Church being involved with education, he noted the restrictions only applied to primary and secondary education. Founding a Catholic university, therefore, was not in violation of the constitution. Although UNAM's rector played an important role, the establishment of Catholic institutions of higher learning could not have gone forward without the approval of the hierarchy. In 1940 Manuel Ávila Camacho came to the presidency openly identifying as Catholic. He effectively put an end to church-state tensions, and during his term the constitutional amendment mandating social education was repealed. The founding of two Catholic universities in this period is an important step toward a different relationship between church and state regarding education.

=== Growth during the new Church-State modus vivendi, 1940–1980 ===
With the cessation of open conflict between Church and State beginning with the Avila Camacho presidency (1940–46), the Catholic Church entered a new period of growth and consolidation. The modus vivendi was the result of both Church and State realizing that further conflict was damaging to both, and the government might have seen a better relationship with the Church as fostering legitimacy for the regime. The president's actions "established the concept of conciliation as an acceptable policy in the political arena, generating a climate favorable to a more open implementation of the conciliation strategy." The number of functioning churches doubled during these four decades, as did the number of seminaries training Mexican priests. The number of priests tripled, which matched the growth in Mexico's population which was rapidly urbanizing. A conservative, pro-Catholic political party had been established in 1939, the National Action Party, and the Church began urging parishioners to vote for the PAN in a number of elections, starting in 1955. Some clerics criticized the government's economic development strategy, but in general, the Church did not intervene in civil matters in any major way.

The Catholic Church and the Mexican government had visibly warming relations, with President Luis Echeverría (1970–76) visiting Pope Paul VI in 1974 and the president's support for the new basilica of Our Lady of Guadalupe. When Pope John Paul II visited Mexico in 1979 as part of the Conference of Latin American Bishops' gathering in Puebla, President José López Portillo (1976–82) gave the pope a warm welcome even though this was not a state visit.

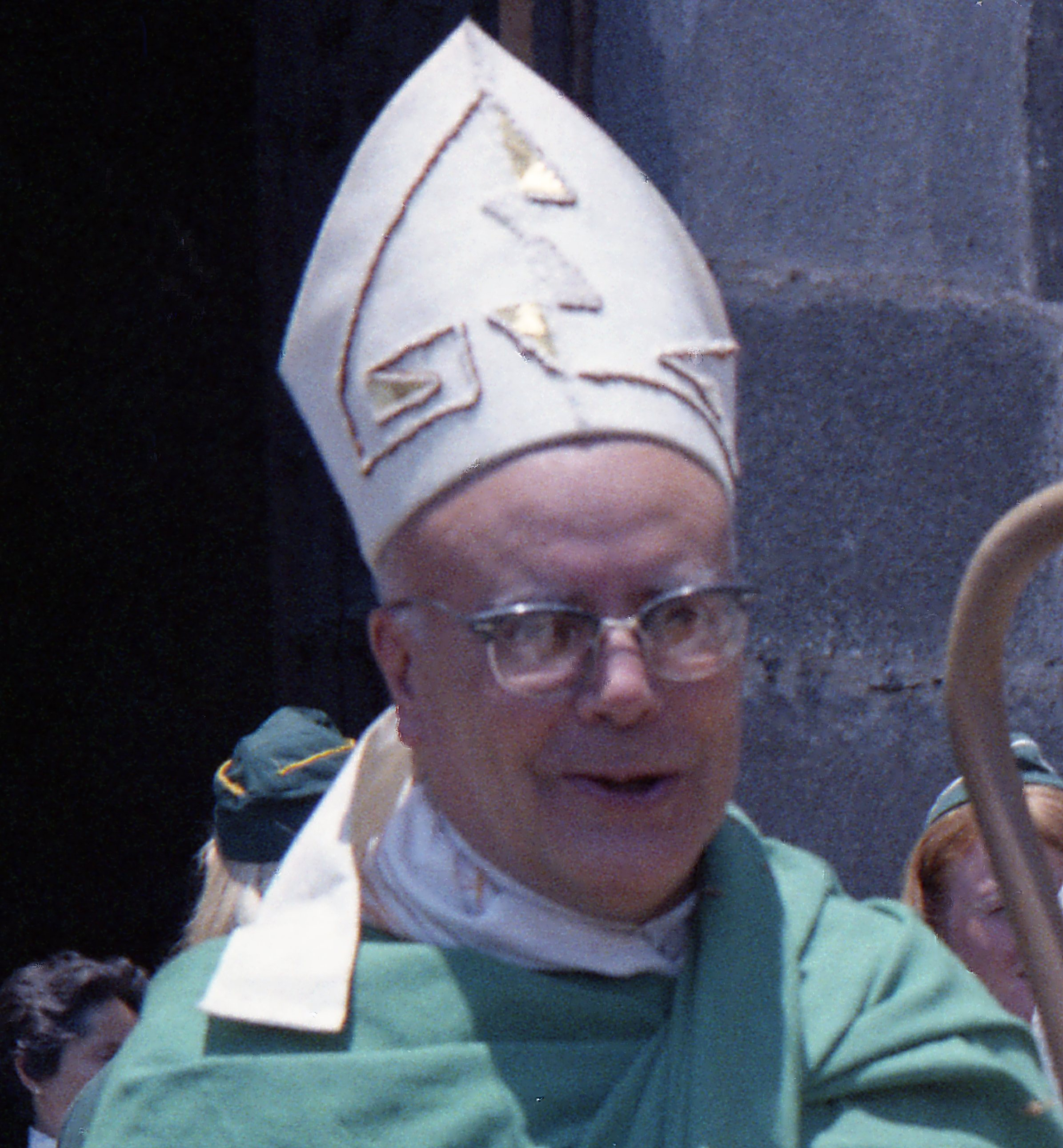
Sergio Méndez Arceo, bishop of Cuernavaca in 1970

The top echelons of the hierarchy sought to continue the modus vivendi in Mexico, but as the Catholic Church underwent changes as a result of the Second Vatican Council, so too did a number of Mexican bishops and laypeople. The bishop of Cuernavaca, Sergio Méndez Arceo, initially appointed in 1953, became an active adherent of liberation theology. He promoted the creation of grassroots ecclesial base communities that promoted a new way of the laity to engage in their faith by promoting their activism. This was similar to the rise of such lay groups under Church supervision in Brazil and in Central America. Méndez Arceo on his own account investigated the circumstances of prisoners following the 1968 student movement, Mexico 68, mobilized around opposition to the 1968 Olympics hosted in Mexico, but expanding to become a larger critique and mobilization against the Mexican state. His report to the Mexican hierarchy received no action, in keeping with the hierarchy's policy to maintain its modus vivendi with the state.

Two other major clerics influenced by Vatican II were Adalberto Almeida y Merino, bishop of Zacatecas at the time of Vatican II, and Manuel Talamás Camandari, head of the Mexican Social Secretariat, an entity under the control of the hierarchy that dealt with social issues. Both men attended all four sessions of the Second Vatican Council and the two drafted a major critique of Mexican social policy. "The Development and Integration of our Country" was a pastoral letter that addressed marginalization of Mexicans and income inequality during Mexico's rapid period of growth, the so-called Mexican Miracle. Bishop Almeida participated in the 1968 meeting of the Conference of Latin American Bishops in Medellín, Colombia, which Pope Paul VI attended. Significant documents articulating liberation theology were drawn up at the meeting, with Almeida helping draft documents on justice and peace.

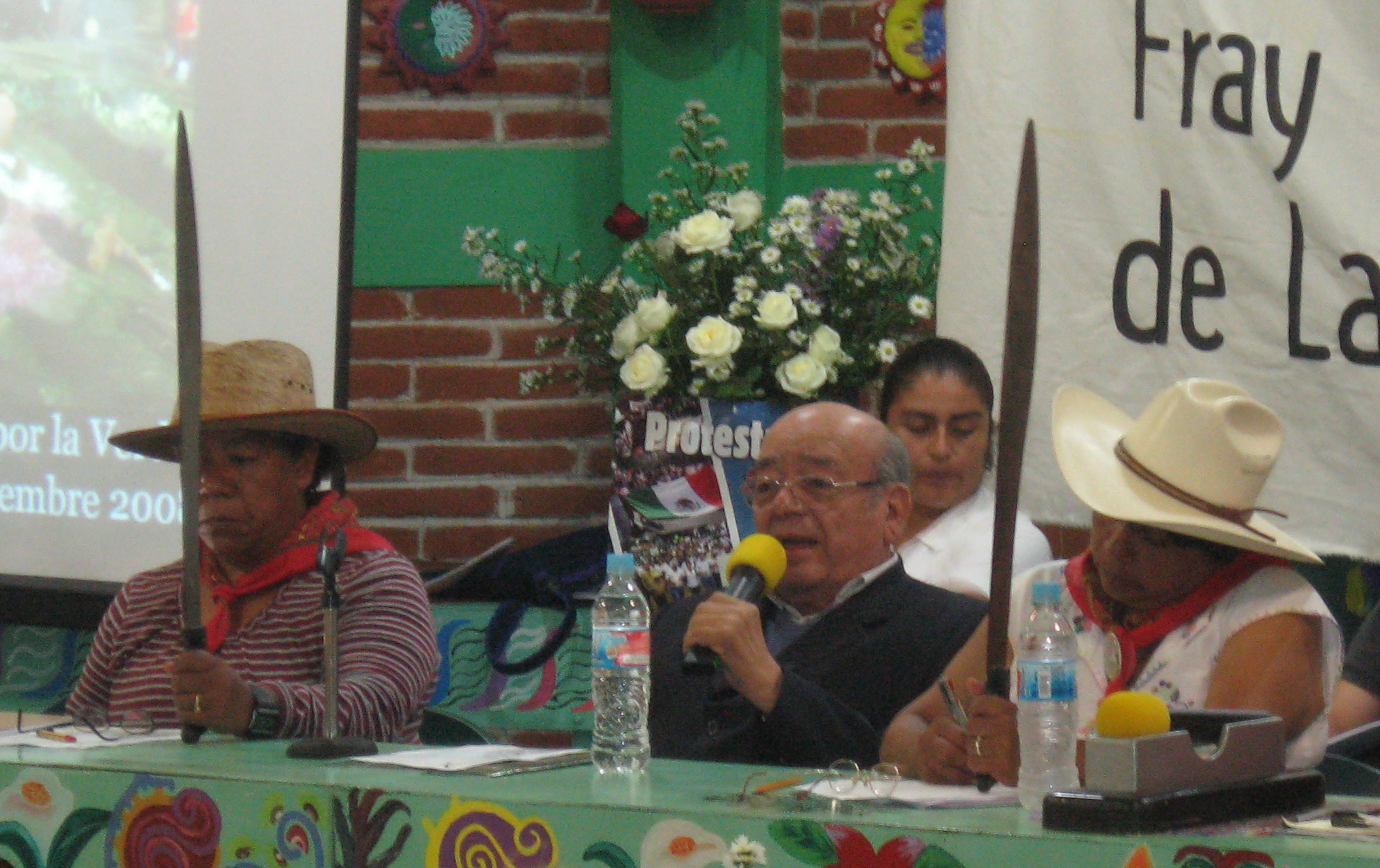
Bishop of Chiapas Samuel Ruiz García

The bishop of San Cristóbal de Las Casas, Chiapas, Samuel Ruiz García also became an important advocate for liberation theology in his poor, southern Mexican diocese. He attended Vatican II, as well as a 1971 bishops' retreat attended by Peruvian cleric Gustavo Gutiérrez, who wrote the seminal text on liberation theology; Sergio Méndez Arceo, bishop of Cuernavaca; and Salvadoran bishop Óscar Romero. Ruiz's diocese had a high proportion of indigenous Mayan parishioners. As he came to know his diocese better, he paid increasing attention to the marginalization and oppression of the Maya. In keeping with the move toward the formation of grassroots ecclesial base communities, Bishop Ruiz actively promoted them. In 1989 he founded the Fray Bartolomé de Las Casas Center of Human Rights, as a step to push back against violence against indigenous and poor peasants. When the 1994 rebellion in Chiapas erupted, Ruiz was named as a mediator between the Zapatista Army of National Liberation (EZLN) and the Mexican government. His role was a significant departure from government practice of working with the Catholic hierarchy, but not giving them power.

=== Liberation Theology in Mexico ===
The passage above mentions the different bishops that played the role of liberationists in Mexico. Though this is important, Liberation Theology in Mexico is much deeper and will be explained in the following information. Liberation Theology as one could put it is a call to action. This call to action would lead to a huge change for the Catholic church and the indigenous people, especially the poor, living in Latin America. Liberation Theology established progressive ideologies with Catholic teachings. One bishop described liberation theology as a “progressive prototype of Catholic faith-an enlightened Christianity that is organic to people's way of life and empowers them to work for social justice for themselves and for others in their community.” Liberation Theology is said to have two different strategies: one using interpreting catholic the gospel to contemporary problems and how the faithful should take action on these problems.

==== Christian Base Communities ====
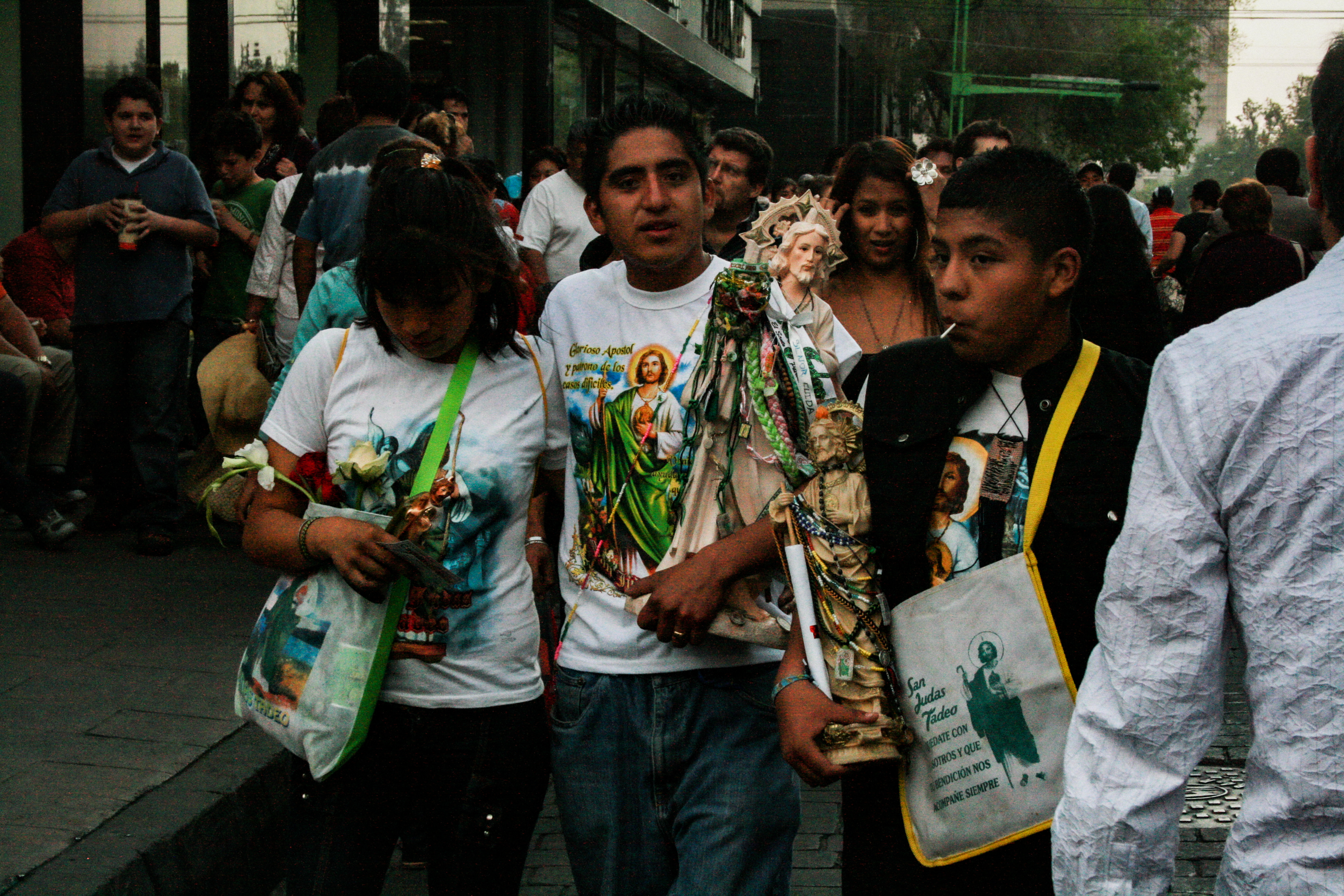
Devotees of Saint Jude Thaddeus, known as 'Sanjuditas,' walking through the heart of Mexico City, carrying images, t-shirts, and scapulars of Saint Jude.

One of the bigger actions that were taken was the establishment of Christian Base Communities (CEB). CEBs were initially encouraged by the Catholic Church in Mexico, due to reasons such as the deficiency of priests and nuns in Mexico particularly in the rural areas. As well as the church was worried about the growing number of protestants.

CEBs provided an opportunity for aid for many of the Mexican communities. In addition to rural areas, CEBs flourished in places with high places of poverty, extremely low unemployment rates, alarming overall malnutrition, and more. For example, in communities in a CEB in Santa Cecilia, Guadalajara, and San Juanito, Oaxaca, In the 1970s in San Juanito, the CEB in Santa Cecilia was led by hundreds of working-class women in the community. They provided aid to the community in a variety of different ways from improving water infrastructure to creating a night school for adults. It wasn't just aid that was provided but the education of progressive ideologies such as gender equality. For example, the community had weekly group discussions and sometimes workshops that reflected on sexism and relationships between men and women. Another CEB that played an important role in its community was in San Juanito, Oaxaca, Mexico.

The first establishment in San Juanito was in 1980 but started to see growth with the arrival of Maryknoll nuns in 1982. The CEB in San Juanito did a number of great things to improve daily life for the community. For example, they set up agriculture practices such as planting crops, setting up health nutrition classes, and weekly meetings discussing peoples' daily problems. The CEBs were not the only contribution to come out of Liberation Theology in Mexico, but also the emergence of radical progressive movements.

==== Radical Clerical Organizations ====
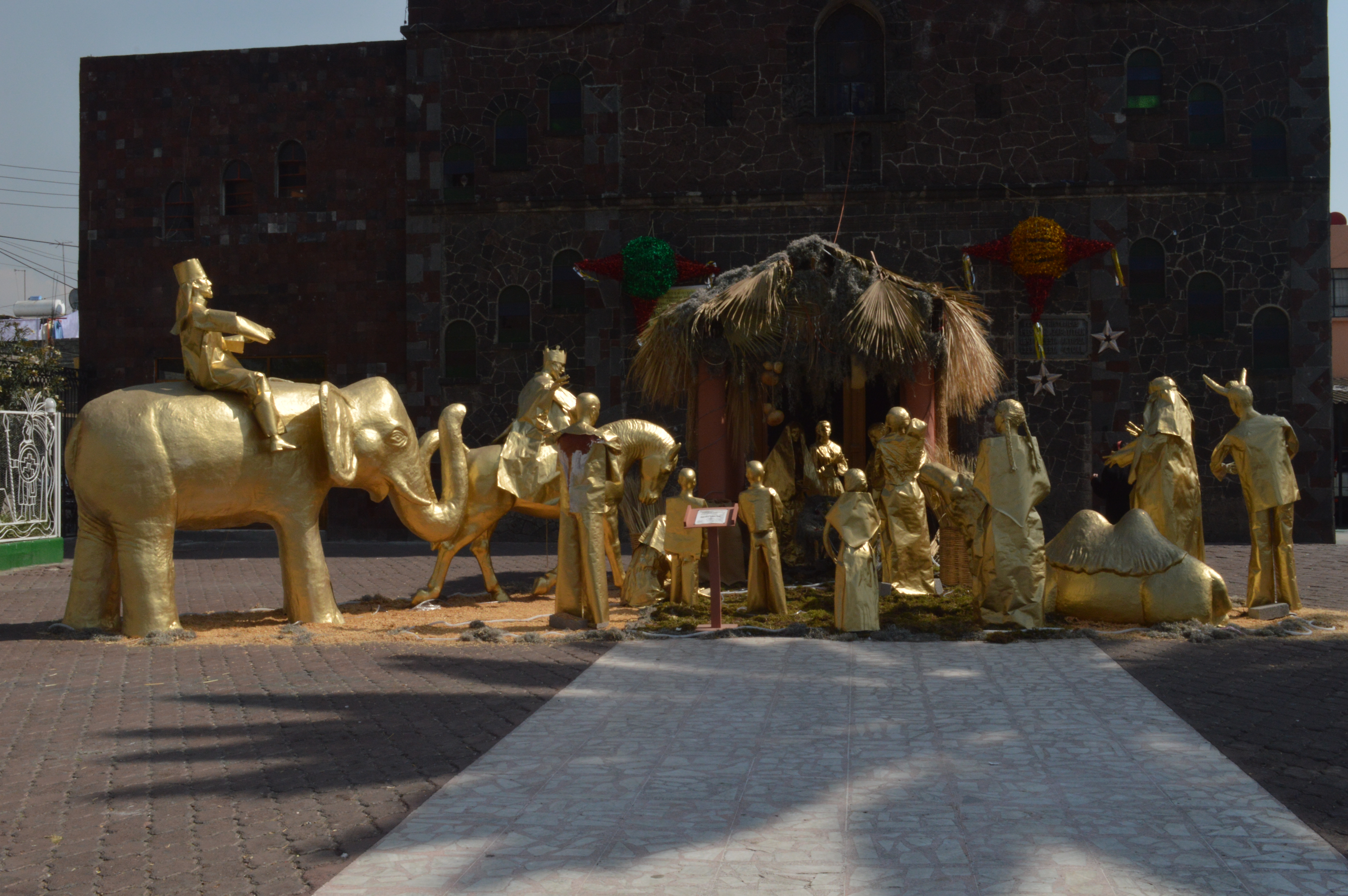
View of the nativity scene in front of the parish church of Santiago Zapotitlan in the Tláhuac borough of Mexico City.

Another idea that came out Liberation Theology was the idea for The Preferential Option for the Poor. The idea would be incorporated with Catholic women's organizations and a foundation to help the strugglers of the workers, peasants, farmers, railroad workers and more. Priests involved with this concept, would also reached out to wealthy catholics and people with the power of influence to reconsider their belief in Catholicism and look to help their fellow Catholics who suffer. Based on the idea of the theological idea of the option for the people emerged two progressive movements political popular and priest for the people.

Before explaining the different radical movements, it is important to mention one Jesuit Priest Rodolfo Escamilla García. Escamilla García was one of the prominent radical priests or the "rebellious priests." Such as movements such priests for the people Garcia joined Mexican Social Secretariat in 1952 and was the founder of the Juventud Obrera Católica (Catholic Workers’Youth, JOC). He advocated the radical “See, Judge, Act” form of socio-religious activism method for public action. Such as priests like García were radical thinkers that would have a large role in the lives of people in Mexican communities educating them on issues such as social justice. Although, some paid the cost by imprisonment, torture, and at worst death. As for García, he was seen as a threat to the Mexican Government that was a PRI (Institutionalized Revolutionary Party), which sided with a very conservative Church and Escamilla García was violently murdered by the Mexican Government in Mexico City in 1977. That same year, Mexico saw another killing of another priest, Rodolfo Aguilar Álvarez. Aguilar Alvarez was from Chihuahua and who offered his support to a group of forcibly displaced Campesinos.

As mentioned above, some radical priests prided themselves on educating people on the leftist ideologies. Such ideologies include Maoism and Marxism. In 1971, it was the priests in Torreón who brought in the Política Popular (PP) Maoists, and together they had a large influence on the people primarily the students in La Laguna. Throughout 1971-1974, students would be influenced by Maoist activists who would in infiltrate their schools by even becoming their teachers. Their influence would lead to a long string of student protests. The range of ages of students were from high school to college where they protested by marching in the streets to even the suspension of classes. The priests and the maoists combined the new Catholic teachings post-Vatican II and the political beliefs of the Maoism all circulating back to the belief of helping the people and poor. Many of the protests were fighting for better conditions for the working class and especially the poor as well. Even the Bishop of Torreon, Fernando Romo declared that “We have to understand that, in case of doubt, Christians should always act on behalf of those in need because that was the position of our Lord Jesus Christ.” Along with Política Popular, Sacerdotes para el Pueblo (Priest for the People, SPP) was also another prominent radical clerical movement in Mexico. SPP was founded in 1972, by a group of theologians who very embraced the Preferential Option for the Poor and socialism. Headed by Dominican Alex Morell, and the movement was centralized around four main goals: The strengthening ties with the popular sectors of society; helping them succeed at economic and political independence from caciques and political parties; educating them the foundations of liberation theology as useful tools to improve their everyday lives; and calling for a socialist alternative to capitalism. The movement ultimately folded in 1975 due to pressure from higher ecclesiastical authority and the violence that priests were facing.

==== Liberation Theology in Seminary Training ====
From 1969 to 1990, the Bishops of Southern Mexico (including Bishop Samuel Ruiz) worked together to operate the Regional Seminary of the Southeast (el Seminario Regional del Sureste, SERESURE). Located in the town of Tehuacán, Puebla, Mexico, SERESURE intended to train priests to be active participants in solving the problems pervasive in the indigenous countryside of southern Mexico such as "economic and political marginalization, caciquismo, land loss, and environmental degradation." They set up the seminary to work with the indigenous people. Scholars argue that SERESURE work on pastoral training separated themselves from other seminaries. This was due to SERESURE’s consistent emphasis on socially aware pastoral work along with hosting annual conferences on indigenous pastoral work. The training in SERESURE focused on three pillars: theological training, intellectual training, and pastoral formation. They believed instead of them teaching the indigenous people about god in their life, the indigenous should be the ones to figure out themselves with the help of the seminary, to be "agents of their own liberation."

Liberation Theology was making progress in Mexico improving the lives of the indigenous people’s and their societies as different Church workers and scholars would come and go. In the 1980s, there would be shift in the Catholic church and the Vatican would eventually lean away from Liberation theology which led to a clampdown on Liberation Theology.

== Changing church-state relations, 1980–2000 ==
=== Clampdown on liberation theology ===
In 1979 with the election of Pope John Paul II, the Polish-born prelate began to systematically dismantle liberation theology. Italian cleric Girolamo Prigione had been appointed in 1978 as the pope's representative in Mexico. With the papacy of John Paul II, he became a key instrument in reining in of activist bishops who had a liberationist stance. In Cuernavaca, liberationist Sergio Méndez Arceo was replaced by Juan Jesús Posadas Ocampo, who dismantled the liberationist programs in the diocese and promoted charismatic Catholicism. Over time, Prigione helped the Vatican select 31 new bishops whose theological outlook was acceptable to the Vatican, basically replacing liberationist bishops with conservative ones. But also important was the Vatican's practice of assigning administrative coadjutors to dioceses and archdioceses, which undermined the power of those bishops who were outspoken and activist. These included Bartolomé Carrasco, bishop of Tapachula in Southern Mexico; Manuel Talamás, bishop of Ciudad Juárez; and Adalberto Almeida y Merino of archbishop of Chihuahua.

=== Church push for civic culture in Chihuahua ===
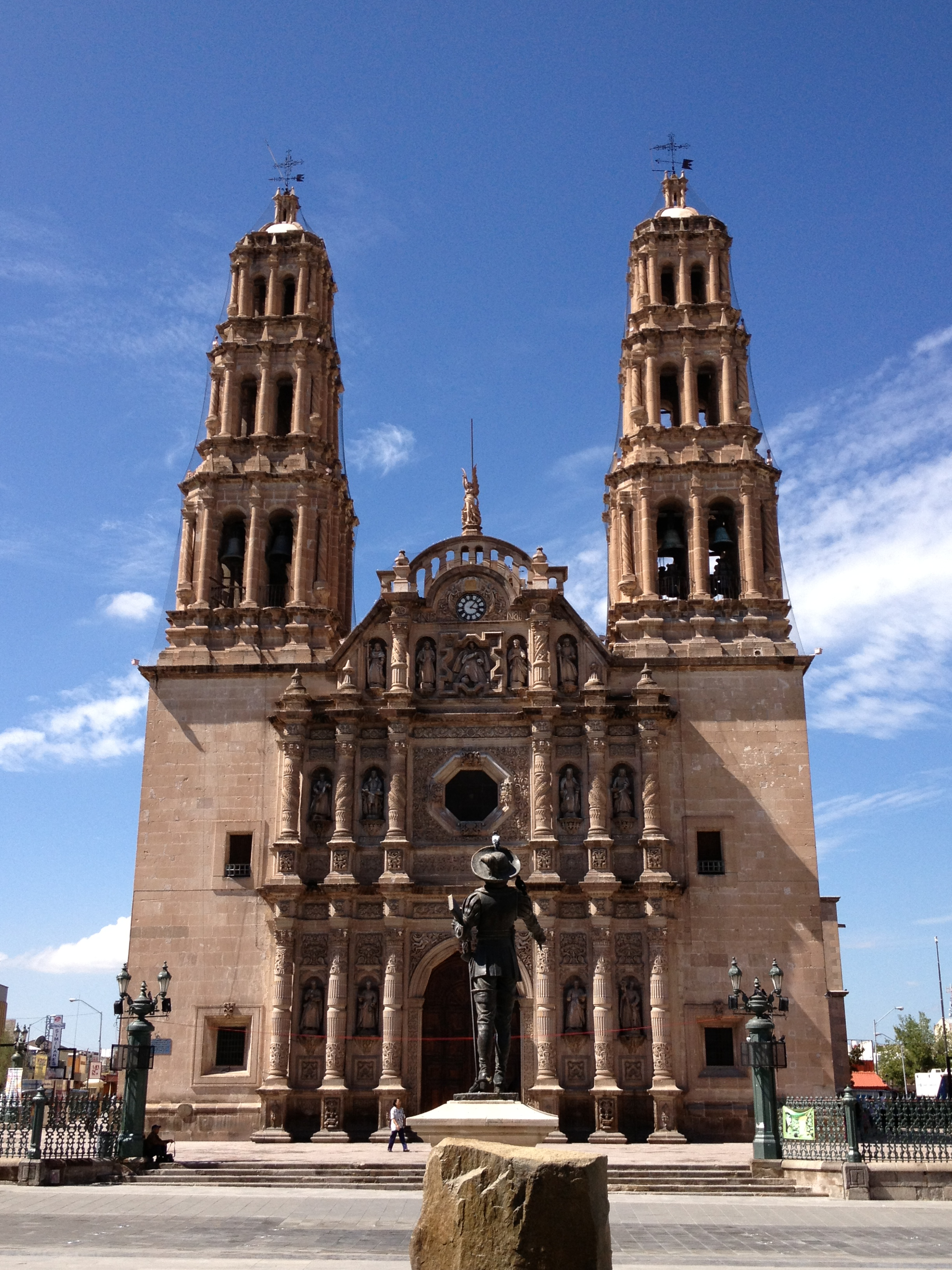
Cathedral of Chihuahua a blend of Baroque and Neoclassical styles.

In the 1980s, the Church in Chihuahua began to take an activist stance on creating a new civic culture in which citizen participation was aimed at promoting clean elections and rule of law. In Chihuahua, Archbishop Adalberto Almeida y Merino began to be outspoken against electoral fraud and government corruption. Almeida issued a document in 1983 entitled "Vote with Responsibility: A Christian Orientation," in which the archbishop urged citizens to vote. Voter apathy had become a problem in Mexico, since many citizens saw the process as corrupt and assumed their vote would not count. Almeida called upon voters to participate and then continue involvement by monitoring winners’ performance in office. This document was the reassertion of the Church's right to "evangelize the totality of human existence including the political dimension." The archbishop did not explicitly advocate for a particular party, although the National Action Party was gaining increasing numbers of votes in northern Mexico. In the municipal elections in Chihuahua that year, voter participation increased significantly and the Institutional Revolutionary Party's candidates fared badly. This touched off an attack by the PRI, that denounced Church participation in elections, and a response from Almeida criticizing the PRI's characterization, saying that their "vision, in addition to being unjust, ingenuous, and arrogant, inevitably leads to an absolutist conception of power, with the consequent destruction of democracy."

During the 1980s the National Action Party (PAN) began to expand its voter base from mainly Catholics to one of the larger Mexican middle class. In Chihuahua, the PAN gained a larger share of votes, and in 1986, was widely expected to win the gubernatorial election. The PAN did not win, due to rigging of the vote, which the PRI justified as "patriotic fraud." Immediately after the election, Archbishop Almeida preached a powerful sermon, cast as the parable of the Good Samaritan, but its meaning was clear, that the voters of Chihuahua had been mugged and brutalized by the PRI's actions. Almeida went further and planned on closing churches in Chihuahua in protest. The Apostolic Delegate in Mexico, Girolamo Prigione, the closest official to a papal ambassador since Mexico and the Vatican had no diplomatic relations, overruled the archbishop. Prigione did not want to see another wave of anticlericalism in Mexico by allowing the church closure. However, the stance that the Church took in challenging electoral fraud in Chihuahua gained it greater legitimacy amongst ordinary Mexicans who also sought to have free and fair elections.

=== Salinas, the Vatican, and reform of the constitution ===
The 1988 election in Mexico was a watershed event. For the first time there were three viable candidates for the presidency, Carlos Salinas de Gortari, an economist and technocrat from the dominant PRI; Manuel Clouthier, a charismatic figure of the PAN; and Cuauhtemoc Cárdenas, the son of President Lázaro Cárdenas, who split from the PRI to form a leftist coalition. The election was again widely seen to have fraudulent results, with Salinas winning, but with the smallest margin ever. Cárdenas and Clouthier and their supporters protested the election results, but Salinas took office in December 1988. Salinas transformed Church-State relations in Mexico during his term and the Vatican and the PAN became important players in that transformation.

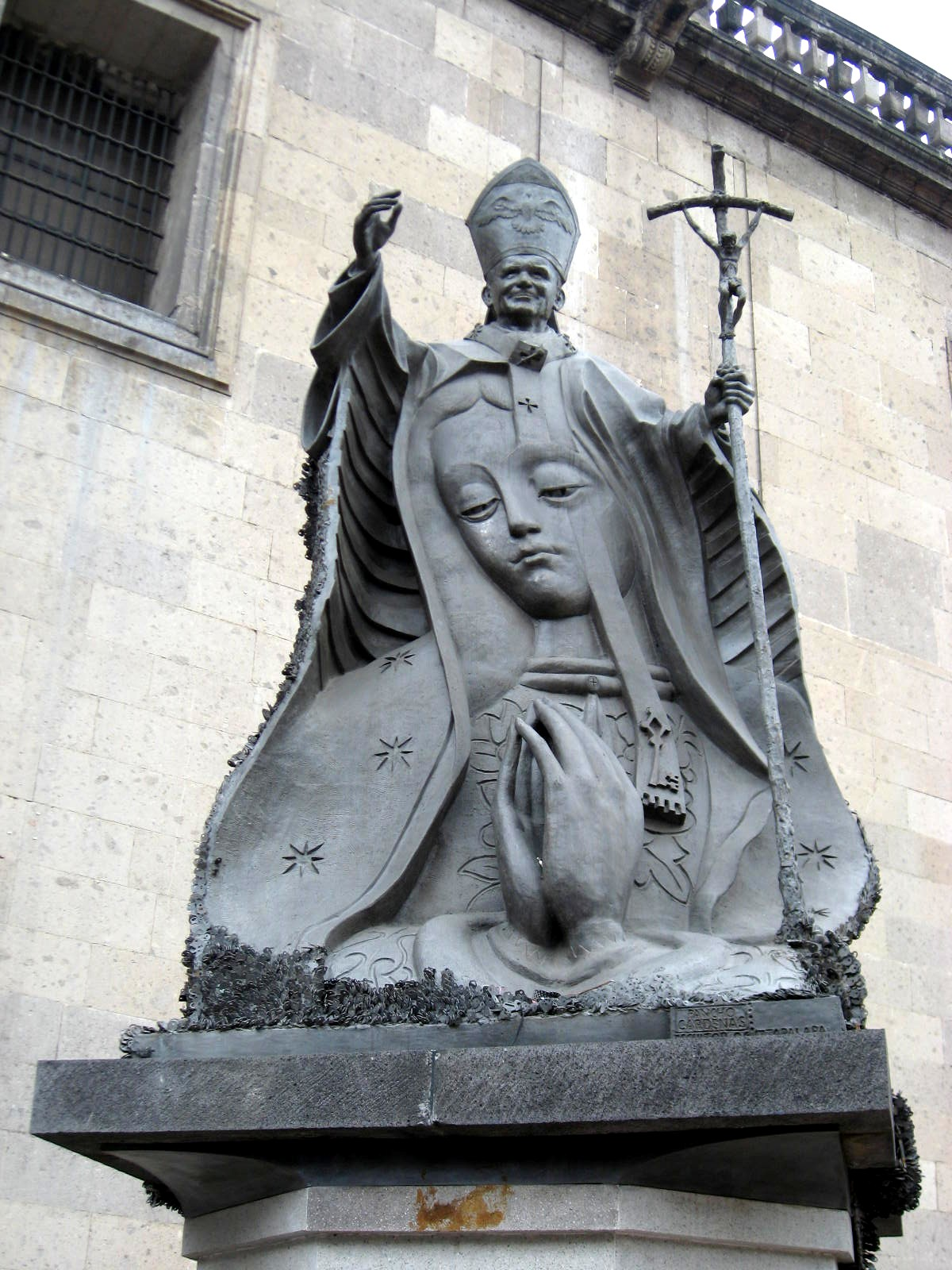
A statue of Pope John Paul II with an image of the Virgin of Guadalupe, near the Metropolitan Cathedral in Mexico City. The statue was made entirely of metal keys donated by the Mexican people.

Religion was an issue in the 1988 elections, with the leftist newspaper La Jornada surveying the prospective candidates about their stance on religious freedom in Mexico. Technocrat Carlos Salinas de Gortari declined to answer the survey and Mexican bishops were concerned about Salinas's attitude toward Church-State relations. The presidential election took an unexpected turn, with the bolting of Cuauhtemoc Cárdenas from the Institutional Revolutionary Party to become a candidate. Mexican bishops urged Mexican voters to "overcome apathy" and fight electoral fraud by participation in the election. The election result of a Salinas victory was almost universally considered to be fraudulent. The Mexican bishops did not make public statements about the election results. Behind the scenes the apostolic delegate to Mexico, Prigione, Mexican bishops, and government officials had a series of secret meetings that hammered out the outlines of a new Church-State relationship. At this point, the PRI needed an ally to shore up its wavering grip on power, and the Church proved to be such an ally. It has been considered a quid pro quo agreement. Sometime during the presidential campaign, the PRI had indicated to the Church that a Salinas victory would be beneficial to the Church. A delegation of the leadership of the episcopal hierarchy attended the inauguration of Salinas on December 1, 1988.

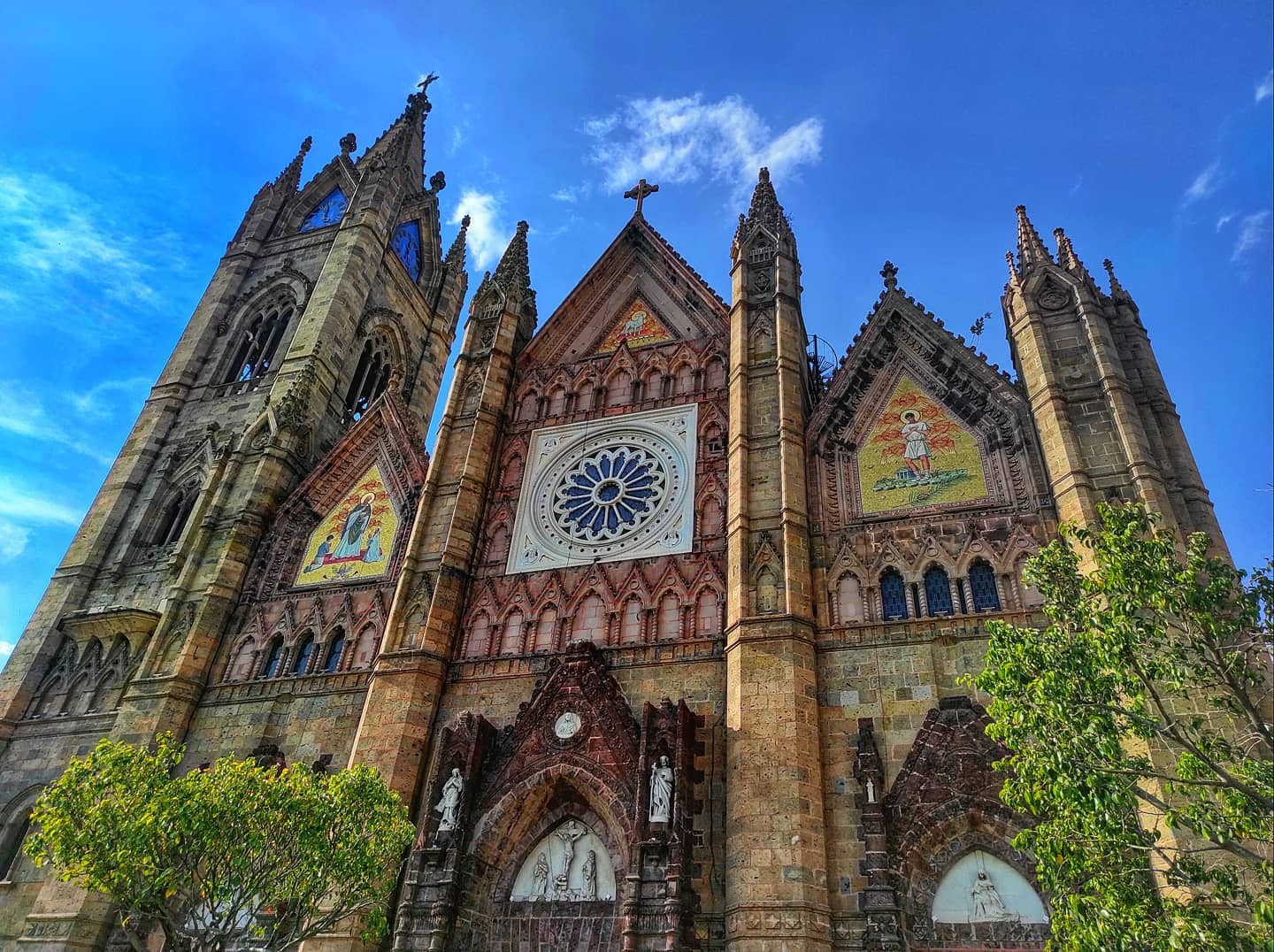
Templo Expiatorio del Santísimo Sacramento neo-Gothic architecture

In his inaugural address, Salinas de Gortari announced a program to "modernize" Mexico via structural transformation. "The modern state is a state which ... maintains transparency and updates its relation with political parties, entrepreneurial groups, and the church." His declaration was an articulation of the direction of change, but not list of specifics.

The implementation of reforms entailed amending the constitution, but before that overcoming opposition on the Left and also in the Catholic Church itself. After considerable debate, the Mexican legislature voted for these fundamental revisions in Church-State policy.

The Constitution of 1917 had several anticlerical restrictions. Article 5 restricted the existence of religious orders; Article 24 restricted church services outside of church buildings; Article 27 empowered the State over fundamental aspects of property ownership and resulted in expropriation and distribution of lands, and most famously in 1938, the expropriation of foreign oil companies. Article 27 also prevented churches from holding real property at all. For the Catholic hierarchy, Article 130 prevented the recognition of the Church as a legal entity, denied to clergy the exercise of political rights, and prevented the Church from participating in any way in political matters.

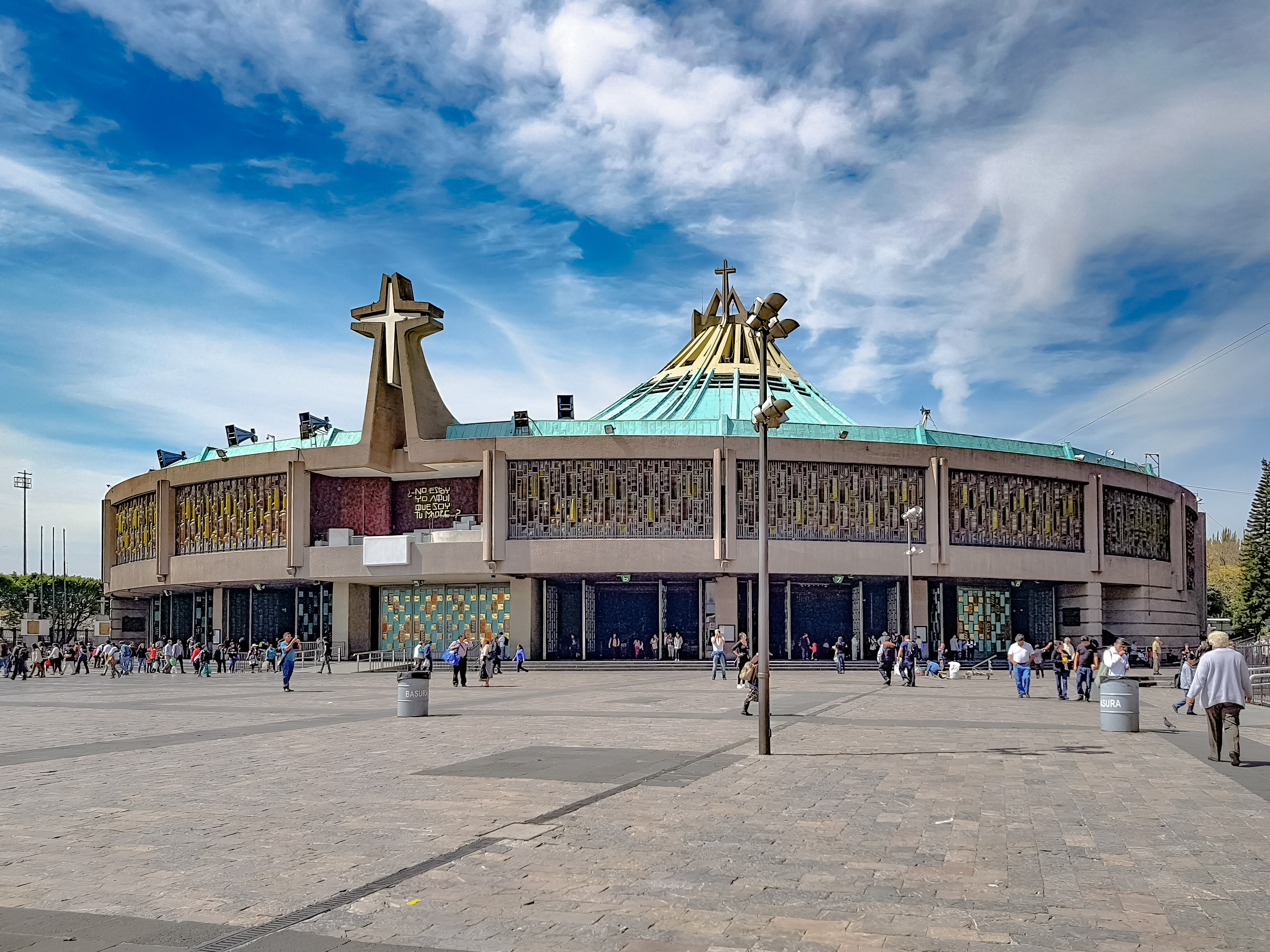
New Basilica of Guadalupe (modern basilica)

The Church had contested all these restrictions from the beginning. With the possibility of changed relations between Church and State, "the main demand of the Catholic hierarchy was centered on the modification of Article 130" to recognize the Church as a legal entity, restore political rights to priests, and to end restrictions "on the social actions of the Church and its members." The initial reaction to changing the constitution was quite negative from members of the Institutional Revolutionary Party who saw anticlericalism as an inherent element of post-Revolution Mexico. It was clear that given the contested nature of the 1988 elections that Salinas could not expect to operate with a mandate for his program. However, the debate was now open. The leftists led by Cárdenas opposed any change in the anticlerical articles of the constitution, since they were seen as the foundation for the power of the secular state. However, the National Action Party (Mexico) in alliance with the weakened PRI became allies to move toward fundamental reforms.

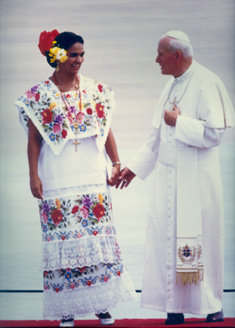
Governor Dulce María Sauri receiving the Pope in August 1993

The Vatican likely sensed a sea-change and in 1990 John Paul II visited Mexico for the first time since 1979 for the Puebla conference of Latin American bishops. After the announcement of his intentions, the Mexican Minister of the Interior (Gobernación) stated flatly that the government would not amend Article 130. Nonetheless, the Mexican government began moves to normalize diplomatic relations with the Vatican. The pope's second 1990 trip in May put increased pressure on the Mexican government to take steps to normalization, particularly after the Vatican and the Soviet Union did so that year. Although Salinas planned a trip to the Vatican in 1991, the Catholic hierarchy in Mexico did not want normalization of relations with the Vatican without discussion of significant changes to the constitution.

An even more significant change came when in his official state of the nation address in November 1991, Salinas stated that "the moment has come to promote new judicial proceedings for the churches," which were impelled by the need "to reconcile the definitive secularization of our society with effective religious freedom." The government proposed changes to the constitution to "respect freedom of religion," but affirmed the separation of Church and State and kept in place secular public education as well as restrictions on clerics’ political participation in civic life and accumulating wealth.

The bill to amend the constitution was submitted to the legislature to reform Articles 3, 5, 24, and 130. The bill passed in December 1991 with the support of the conservative National Action Party (PAN). The enabling legislation was debated far more than the initial bill, but in July 1992, the Ley de Asociaciones Religiosas y Culto Público (Religious Associations Act), the implementation legislation, passed 408–10. The leftist Partido Revolucionario Democrático struggled with whether to support this significant change to Mexico's anticlericalism, but most PRD legislators did in the end.

=== Protestant groups and constitutional reform ===
Although the legislation was inclusive of all "religious associations", the Catholic Church in Mexico had been the object of the government's regulation of religious institutions, worship, and personnel. Protestant groups remained largely silent during the debates, although in both theory and practice they would be affected. Evangelical churches suffered initially with the new regulations, since in order for a religious group to register with the government, it has to have been functioning for five years and have sufficient property to support itself.

=== Cardinal Posadas Ocampo's murder ===
In 1993, Cardinal Juan Jesús Posadas Ocampo of Guadalajara was shot 14 times at point blank range at the international city's airport, as he waited in his car for the arrival of the apostolic nuncio. The Mexican government claimed that the cardinal's murder was the result of mistaken identity by narcotrafficker hitmen. The Catholic hierarchy has disputed the story and during the presidency of Vicente Fox (2000–06), the investigation was re-opened but with no definitive results. The US Congress also held hearings on the case in 2006.

== Issues in the 21st century ==
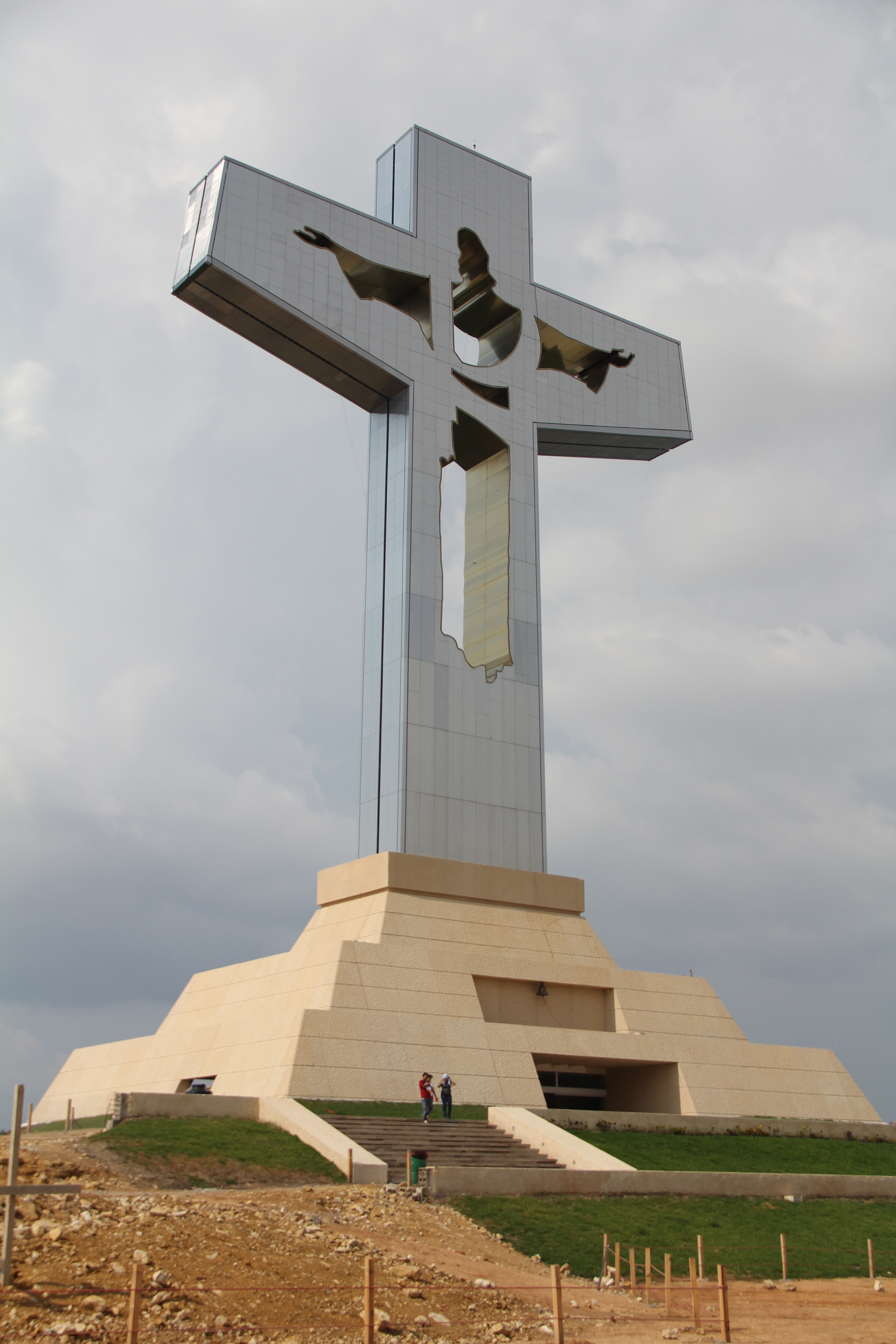
Cristo de Chiapas, a monumental cross in Tuxtla Gutiérrez constructed in 2011

=== Child sex abuse scandals ===
Several cases of sexual abuse of minors by priests have come to light. The best known case is that of Marcial Maciel, founder of the Legion of Christ. Father Maciel was accused of abusing dozens of boys over a period of fifty years; although he was never convicted of a crime and always maintained his innocense, both the Legion of Christ and the Catholic Church apologized for his actions and the coverup after his death. In December 2019 the Legion admitted that 33 priests had sexually abused at least 175 children ages 11–16 between 1941 and 2019. Sixty of the cases were related to Maciel and the total does not include 90 pupils abused by 54 seminrians.

Cardinal Norberto Rivera Carrera was pressured into retirement in 2007 after he was accused of covering-up sexual abuse.

In 2012, Fr. Manuel Ramírez García was accused of abusing thirteen children in San Pedro Garza García, Nuevo Leon. Fr. Carlos López Valdez of Tlalpan, Mexico City, was sentenced to 60 years of prison in 2018 for abusing a boy. Fr. Luis Esteban Zavala Rodríguez of the Diocese of Irapuato was convicted of raping a 12-year-old girl in 2019; he received 65 years in prison.

=== Priests targeted by narcotraffickers ===
Since 2012, the violence by narcotraffickers has widened to include Catholic priests; those in the southern state of Guerrero are particularly at risk. The Catholic hierarchy in the state issued a plea to the Mexican government to deal with drug violence. A Mexican sociologist, Bernardo Barranco, states that "the rise of violence against priests reflects the role in which they place themselves: as warriors on the front lines of the struggle for human rights in the midst of drug-related violence."

=== Pope Francis visit ===
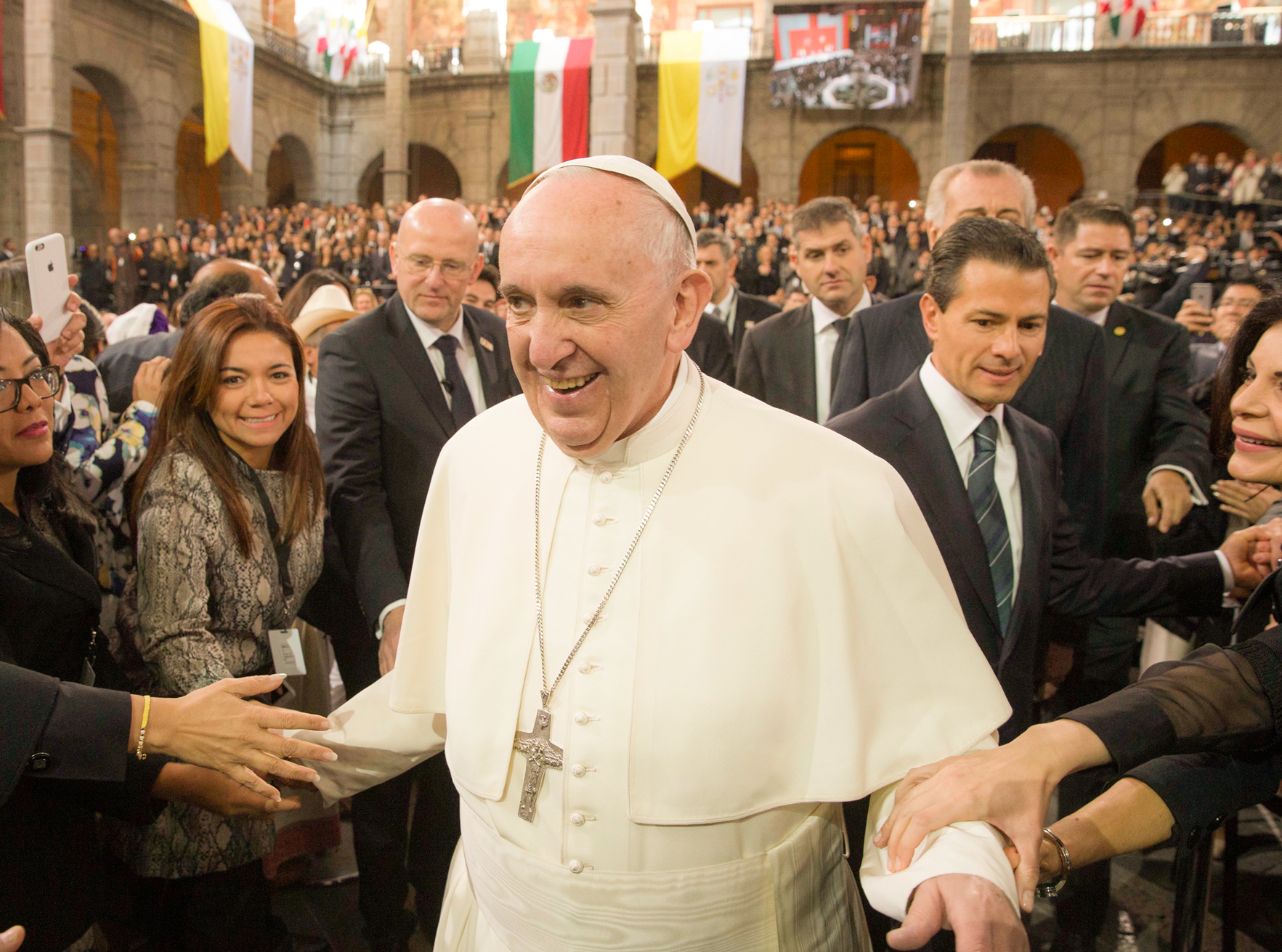
Pope Francis in Mexico. February 13, 2016.

Pope Francis in his visit to Mexico was criticized by some for his effort to not antagonize the government. "He focused on one of his main talking points, inequality, while skipping any thorny local political issues." But at the USA border in Ciudad Juárez, he "delivered a stinging critique of leaders on both sides of the fence" for the "humanitarian crisis" of forced migration. And "he went to the heart of the cartel's dark territory in Morelia, Michoacán, and told the young crowd that Jesus wants them to be disciples, not 'hitmen'." In Chiapas he told the indigenous people that "the world needs their culture and asked for forgiveness for those who had contaminated their lands." He broke with Vatican tradition in celebrating Mass with these indigenous peoples, and challenged Catholic bishops in Mexico to "show singular tenderness" toward them.

=== Falling membership ===
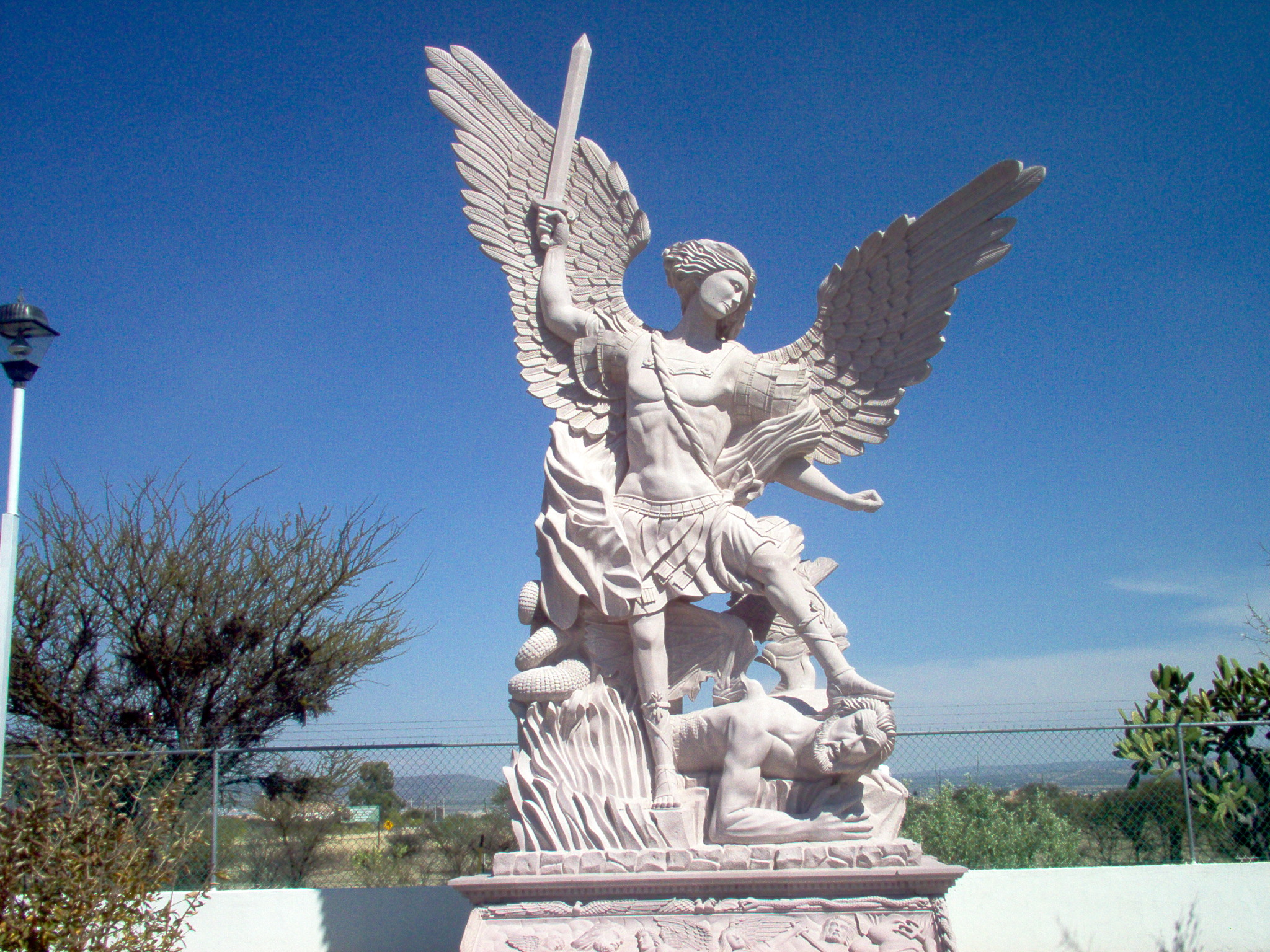
The Archangel Michael, immortalized in pink cantera stone (San Miguel el Alto, Mexico)

The census conducted by INEGI in 2020 revealed that 97.8 million Mexicans (77.7%) of a total population of 126 million identify as Catholics. This represents an increase from 2010 when 84 million people (82.7%) were Catholics, which is a "drastic fall" in percentage according to a Church spokesperson. Protestant and Evangelical congregations have grown 7.5% in the last decade, and 10.2 million people (8.1%) have no religion, double that of ten years ago. The Catholic weekly Desde la Fe wrote in an editorial, "El bien generalmente no es noticia, el mal, siempre es magnificado. La Iglesia ha tenido un desgaste moral ante la sociedad, por el mal ejemplo de algunos. Es tiempo de conversión hacia el interior." ("Good is generally not news, evil is always magnified. The Church has suffered a moral erosion before society, due to the bad example of some. It is time for inward conversion.")

== See also ==
- List of the oldest churches in Mexico
- Roman and Eastern Catholicism in Mexico
- Religion in Mexico
