= Puebla Cathedral =

Roman Catholic cathedral of Puebla, Mexico

Cathedral Basilica of Puebla
- Basílica Catedral Metropolitana de Nuestra Señora de la Purísima Concepción
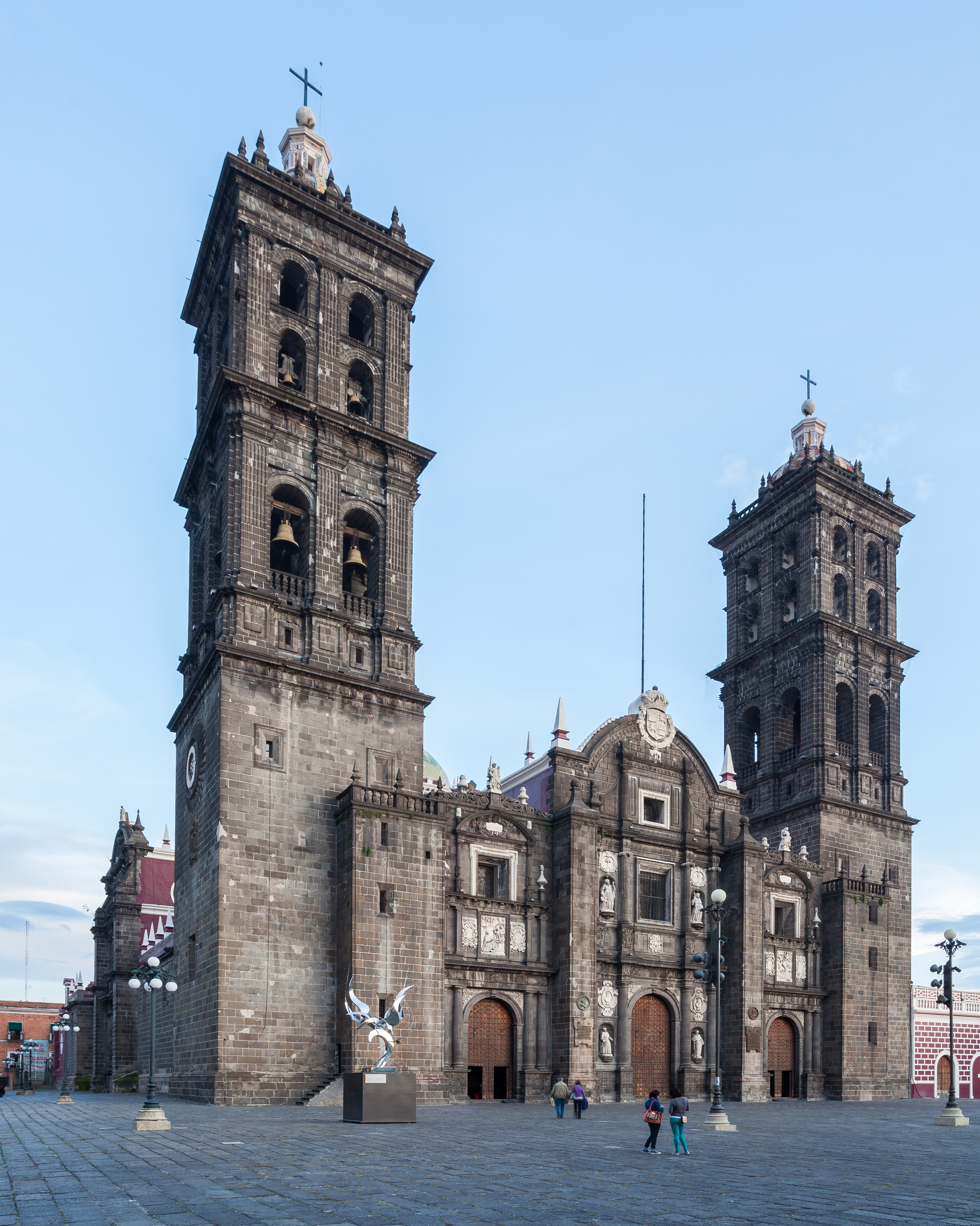
- Puebla Cathedral

Religion
- Affiliation: Roman Catholic
- Diocese: Archdiocese of Puebla de los Ángeles
- Ecclesiastical or organisational status: Cathedral and Minor basilica
- Year consecrated: 18 April 1649; 377 years ago

Location
- Location: Puebla de Zaragoza, Mexico
- Interactive map of Cathedral Basilica of Puebla
- Coordinates: 19°02′34″N 98°11′54″W

Architecture
- Architects: Francisco Becerra and Juan Gómez de Trasmonte (cathedral); Manuel Tolsá (cypress); Pedro García Ferrer (Altar of the Kings); Cristóbal de Villalpando (frescoes)
- Style: Herrerian style (mainly), Neoclassical, Baroque
- Groundbreaking: 18 November 1575; 451 years ago
- Completed: (South tower) 1737; 289 years ago

Specifications
- Direction of façade: West-Orient
- Length: 97.67 m (320 ft)
- Width: 51 m (170 ft)
- Width (nave): 82 m (270 ft)
- Spire: 2
- Spire height: 70 m (230 ft)

UNESCO World Heritage Site
- Official name: Part of the Historic Centre of Puebla
- Type: Cultural
- Criteria: ii, iv
- Designated: 1987 (11th session)
- Reference no.: 416
- Region: Latin America and the Caribbean

The Basilica Cathedral of Puebla, as the Cathedral of Our Lady of the Immaculate Conception is known according to its Marian invocation, is the episcopal see of the Archdiocese of Puebla de los Ángeles (Mexico). It is one of the most important buildings in the historic center of Puebla declared a World Heritage Site by UNESCO. It has the prerogative of being the first sumptuous temple that under fine architectural designs was built in the Americas, consecrated in 1649, ahead of the Metropolitan of Mexico that was dedicated in 1653. It was founded by Philip II of Spain.

The current Herrerian-style cathedral was built between the 16th and 17th centuries, and replaced the previous one that existed in what is now the atrium. Seventy-four years passed from the beginning of its construction in 1575 to its consecration, during the reigns of three successive kings of Spain, Philip II, Philip III and Philip IV. The setbacks that occurred throughout those years led to numerous modifications of the original layout. By 1624 the works were completely suspended until the arrival of Bishop Juan de Palafox y Mendoza in July 1640, who resumed the works with determined enthusiasm. The new reforms gave a higher elevation to the central nave above the processional ones, allowing the passage of natural light and giving it the appearance of a pyramidal structure. It was consecrated by Bishop Juan de Palafox y Mendoza on April 18, 1649, without having been completely finished.

The space it occupies is rectangular in shape, recharged in the corner of another larger floor, forming a large space for the atrium. The building is organized into five naves: a central one, two lateral ones and two niche chapels, its Renaissance-style façade stands out. Attached to its back is a building for offices of the Mitra, its former headquarters, and the building of the chapel called Ochavo. With its little more than 70 meters high, it was the tallest church in the Spanish colonies.

The cathedral is considered one of the most important museums of New Spanish and later art due to the treasures it houses. Over the centuries it has been enriched in works of painting, sculpture, goldsmithing and carpentry of great artistic quality, as well as its decorations, the large boarded doors, aluminum and the treasures of the sacristy that protect the rich priestly ornaments embroidered with gold and silver thread, sacred vessels, chalices, ciboria, reliquaries and crosses bathed in gold inlaid with jewels and diamonds. Its historical archive has documents dating back to the founding of the city and many are waiting to be classified.

== The foundation of the cathedral ==
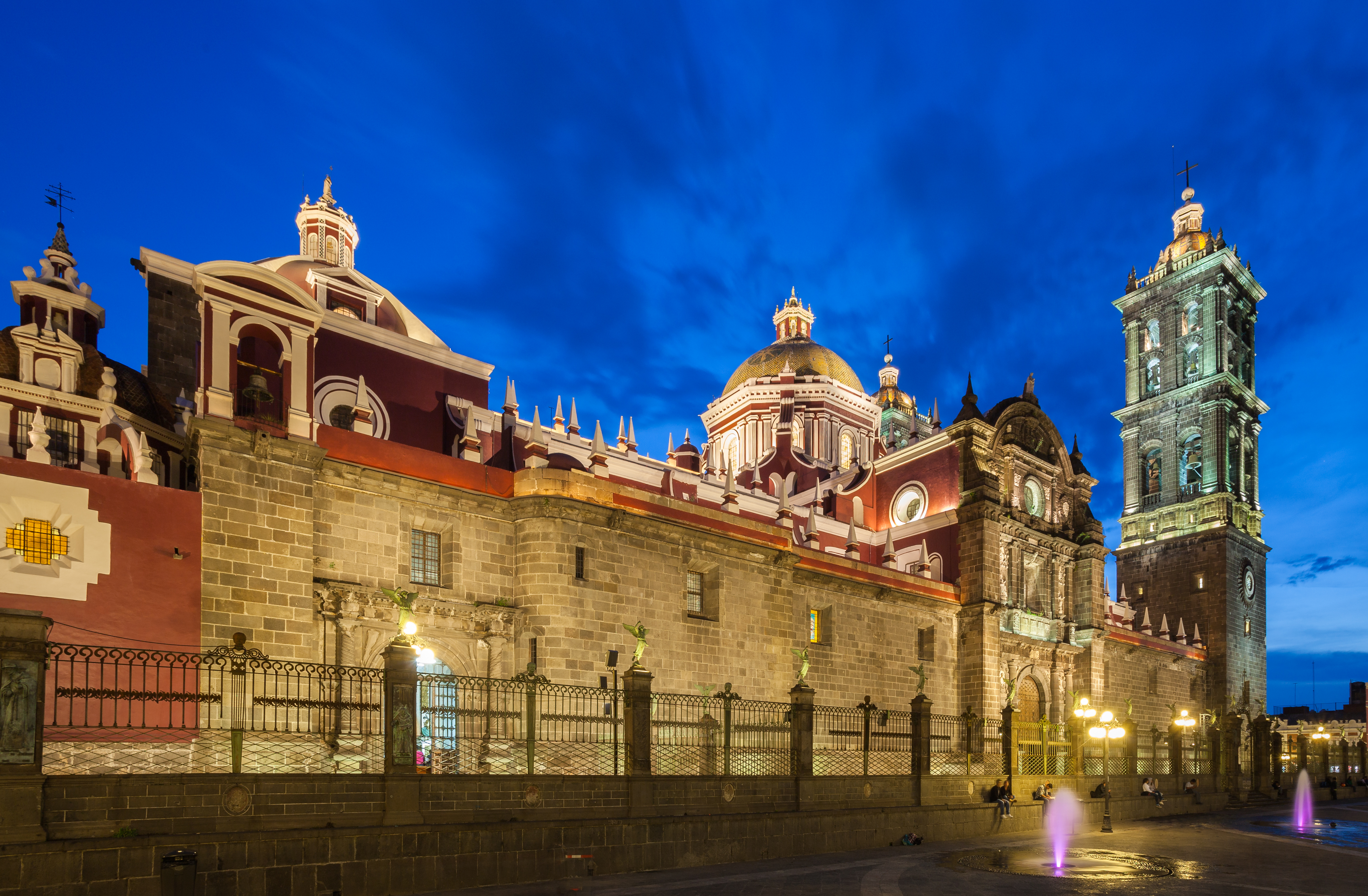
The cathedral from the Plaza Mayor or Zócalo.

=== The first church ===
Once Queen Isabella of Portugal, wife of Carlos V, Holy Roman Emperor authorized on January 18, 1531, at the request of the Real Audiencia, the foundation of a town of Spanish Christians in the province of Tlaxcala, in the place called Cuetlaxcoapan, It was necessary to build the first parish church in the city, for which it was decided to do it in front of the Plaza Mayor in what would be called Portal de Borja and from 1852 Portal Iturbide, it was located in the middle of the street bordering on both sides with the lots granted to the first residents of the city, the mayor Hernando de Elgueta and Alonso González, who were given a license to build portals. (Note: These neighbors did not make their portals of the same height, as a result of which, when this first temple was dismantled to regularize the square and continue the portal, it was left with the deformity that is still notable today, since a part is lower and its arches are uneven.) In the sacristy of this parish, a meeting was held on May 16, 1535, with fifty-seven people who signed before a clerk in order to start the construction of a new larger church, while Bishop Julián Garcés announced, in a general meeting with the people, their intention to build a new temple.

=== The old major church ===
In 1537, once the new city had the minimum conditions for Bishop Garcés to reside there, the Cabildo requested, among other things, his transfer, which occurred on October 3, 1539, with the consent of Viceroy Antonio de Mendoza; therefore the bishop's cathedral would occupy small and provisional buildings until there was the definitive one. In 1543, the construction of a temple for the new episcopal seat was approved by real cédula of Carlos V, Holy Roman Emperor which received the new bishop Friar Martín Sarmiento de Ojacastro since Garcés had died the previous year. Meanwhile, the space dedicated to the temple next to the Plaza Mayor had been occupied by primitive residents and there was a need to buy the houses recently built by them.

Since its foundation, the Spanish colony had been projected to form a set of rectangular blocks, in which a large central space was reserved for said plaza and another one was left next to it, which after the first years of uncertainty about its use became it would become a major church. Construction began on August 29, 1535, with the financial help of Bishop Ojacastro and settlers from the city where the first stone was laid, with the assistance of Corregidor Hernández de Elgueta and Mayor Alonso Martín Partidor.

The temple of 1535 was in the same space that the cathedral occupies today, however its exact position is still being discussed, but not its orientation, from north to south, that is, facing the Plaza Mayor. His factory, according to his contemporaries, was mediocre, however Motolina wrote in 1541 “it is very solemn, and stronger and larger than all those built to date throughout New Spain. It has three naves and the pillars are made of very good black stone and of good grain, with its three doors, in which there are three very carved portals and a lot of work”. Because of the quality of its materials, it had to be repaired on several occasions in which the Temple of Nuestra Señora de la Concordia served as cathedral.

The modest Major church did not correspond to the claims of the inhabitants of the city of los Angéles who had requested its expansion until they finally obtained the consent of the king to build a new cathedral.

=== The new cathedral ===
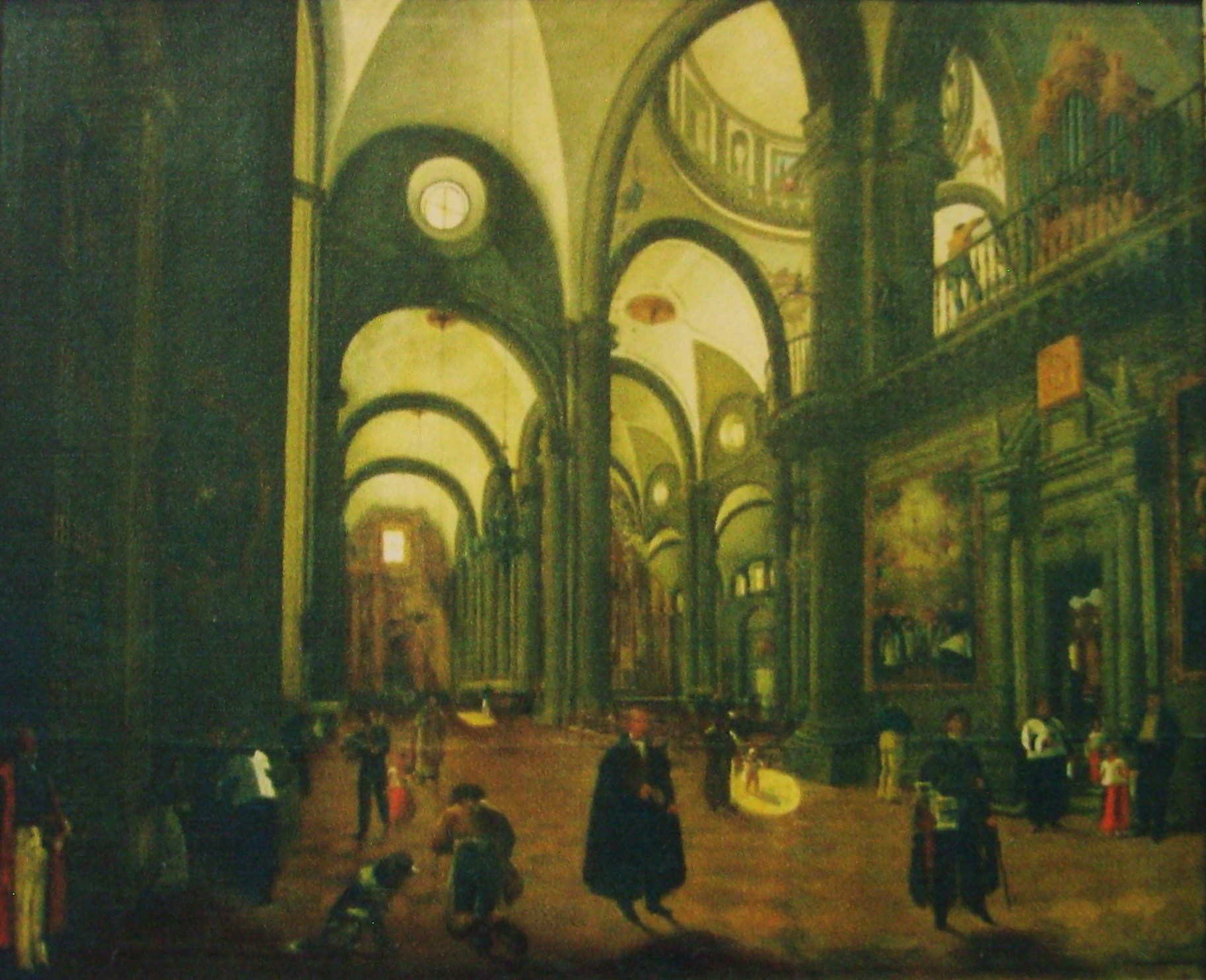
Processional nave of the gospel of the cathedral of Puebla, early-19th century, oil painting by José Manzo, who transformed some of the Baroque altarpieces of the chapels into the Neoclassical style.

The orders to carry out the projects and preparatory matters took many years, and a real cédula of 1552 signed by Prince Philip II of Spain in Monzón (Huesca) recommended that they get down to work and even the help offered by the king in the year 1560 was not taken advantage of by lack of resources. It had to be bought from Alonso Martín Partidor himself, owner of the houses where the cathedral would be built.

Finally, on November 18, 1575, construction work began. The initial architect was the Spaniard Francisco Becerra, designated major master, together with Juan de Cigorondo, senior worker, who prepared the layout and model as well as the interior and exterior, showing them to the Dean and the Cathedral Chapter and, upon approval, they were given the land and instructions for laying foundations. At first the works received an important boost and the viceroy himself ordered that the Indians of Cholula and Tlaxcala participate in the construction of the cathedral.

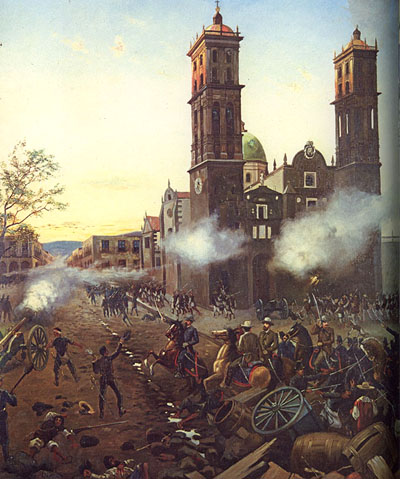
Image showing the Battle of Puebla defeating the French, painting of 1863 (cathedral pictured).

The building should be centered longitudinally on the large block that was assigned to it, loaded towards the east with an atrium in front that would have that of a cemetery among its functions, the latter over time would be the object of several construction projects to close it and encompass in front of the feet of the temple the cathedral Tabernacle. The direction of the building would be east–west, so the Plaza Mayor of the city would be on its north side.

In 1580 Francisco Becerra left Mexico called by the viceroy of Peru to carry out the works on the cathedral of Quito and Cusco, leaving the works on the cathedral unfinished, which were resumed between 1587 and 1590 by order of the viceroy Álvaro Manrique de Zúñiga on the basis of a new trace and in which natives of Tlaxcala and Cholula had to work.

Between 1618 and 1640 the works were suspended at the height of the walls and cornices, missing the altar, chapels, vaults and the floor that at that time was made of dirt floor, however Juan Gómez de Trasmonte had already been working since 1634 on reforming the Becerra project, since he had been designated as major master, but it was not until the arrival of Bishop Juan de Palafox y Mendoza that his plan could pass from the plan to the works.

Gómez de Trasmonte, who had served as Major Master of the Mexico City Metropolitan Cathedral, adapted the project, giving it a more classical appearance and a basilica plan.

=== The era of Palafox y Mendoza ===
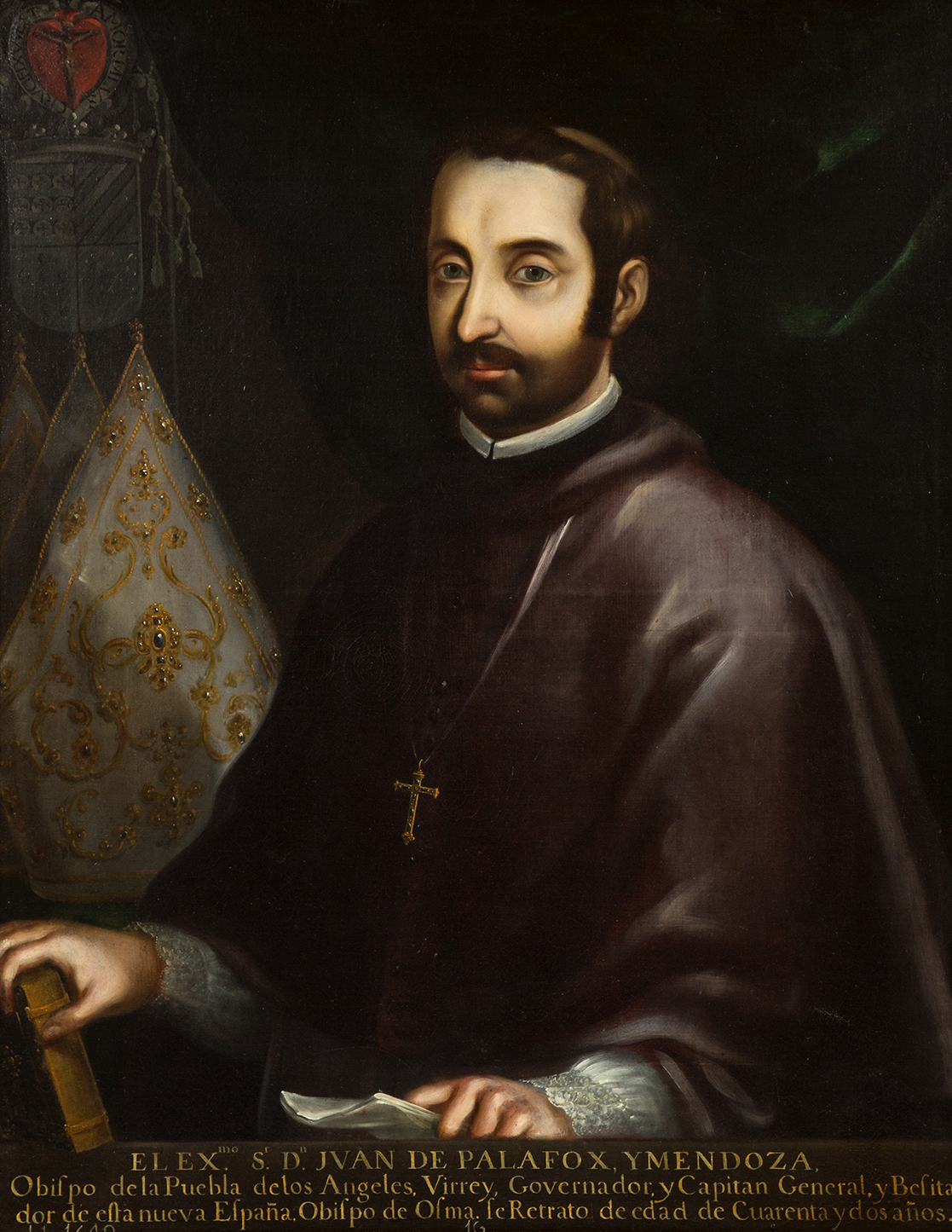
The arrival of Bishop Juan de Palafox y Mendoza in Puebla meant the resumption of work that had been interrupted for years, as he soon became an enthusiastic promoter of its completion.

Bringing Palafox with him a real cédula dated January 19, 1640 that ordered the works to be finished and concluded, the new bishop of Puebla ordered its resumption, but not before visiting the cathedral that, seeing it in total carelessness, described it:

(...) I found this temple built only up to half of the pillars and everything exposed, without any instruments and materials or effects ready to be bought, without having begun any arch or vault and without hope of continuing. Outlaws of justice were collected in it for being considered sacred. Married Indians lived in the chapels, and other indecencies.

In these circumstances, Palafox undertook a fundraising campaign that included the entire society of Puebla, contributing his own inheritance, asking for contributions to the secular Cabildo, the highest, and raising the tithes, the latter action that caused him a confrontation with the religious orders and in particular with the Jesuits.

The resumption of the factory required the workforce of 1,500 officers and peons that Palafox supervised every week. Gómez de Trasmonte's project gave more elevation to the central nave, giving it a pyramidal appearance seen from the front, not as a whim or aesthetic, but to give more lighting to the interior, however when the cathedral was finally consecrated on Sunday, April 18, 1649, the towers were missing and the facade had not been completed.

On the afternoon of the Tuesday following the consecration, the remains of five bishops of the eight that the diocese had had were transferred and the Blessed Sacrament was celebrated with an innumerable turnout. The celebrations were intermingled with the sadness of the next departure of Bishop Palafox to Spain. The Jesuits with whom Palafox had had an open conflict for various reasons, finally managed to transfer him to March 6, 1647. The bishop not only left his cathedral to Puebla but also the San Pedro Colleges and the nucleus of the Palafoxian Library.

=== Later additions ===
- At later dates, covers and facades were completed, such as the main one, called the Puerta del Perdón, finished in 1664.
- That same year in July, in a town hall session, the work for the construction of the "Ochavo" was approved, a place to store valuable religious ornaments, commissioning its construction to the renowned architect Carlos García Durango, who had intervened in the enclosure of some vaults and the conclusion of the north tower.
- The side facade called San Cristóbal, which faces north, was completed in 1690.
- The iron dressing: the bars of the chapels, the railing that runs from the chancel to the choir, the one that surrounds it and those of the chancel of the Altar of the Kings were added around 1691.
- The entire cathedral was paved in 1772 with the so-called Santo Tomás marble brought from the Tepozuchil hill, placed instead of the original brickwork called petatillo left by Bishop Palafox.

== Exterior ==
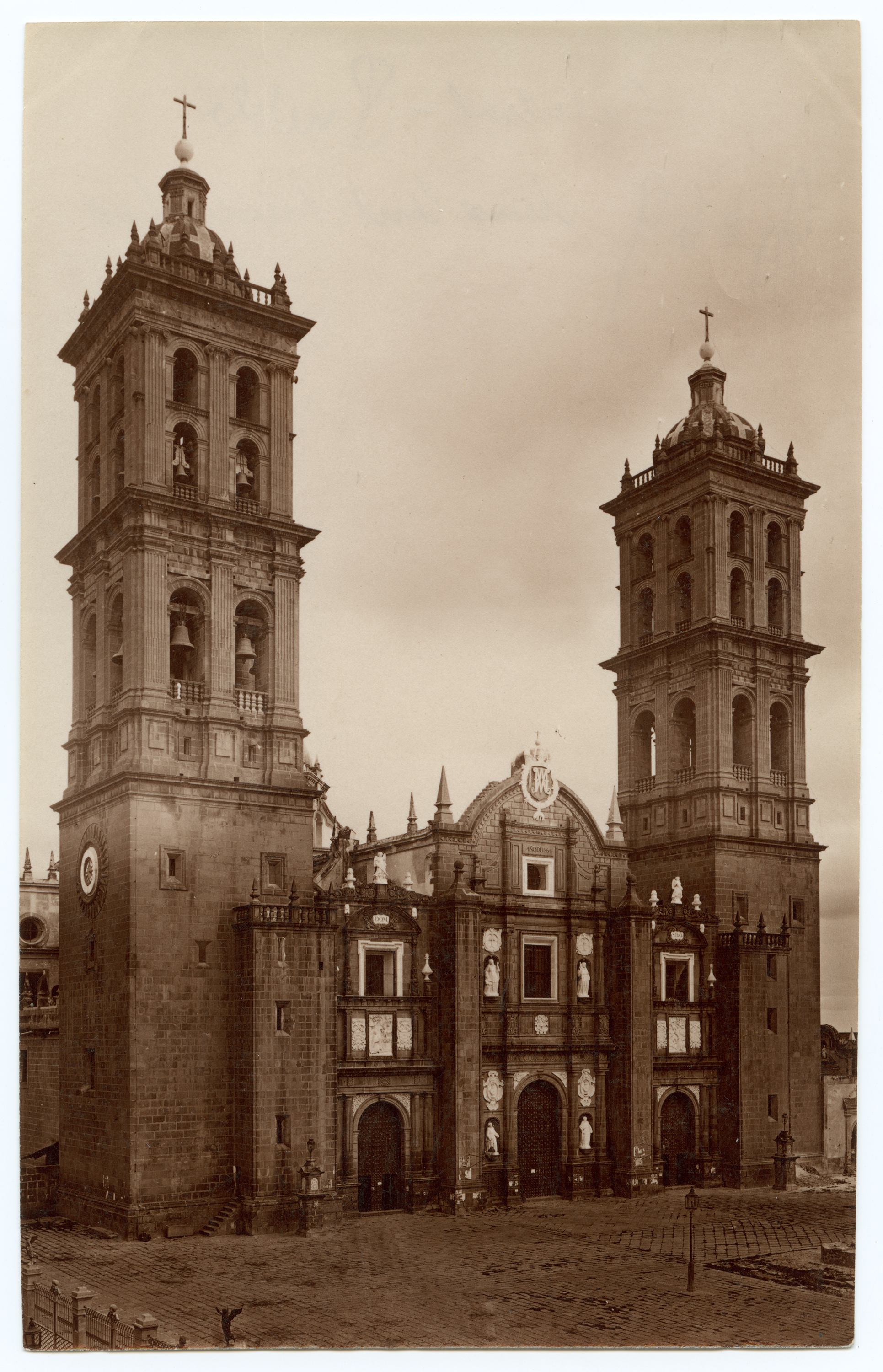
The Puebla Cathedral in 1875.

The plot where the cathedral or basilica floor is built comprises the same as any city block: 120 meters long by 80 meters wide. The cathedral measures 97.67 meters long by 51 meters wide, is traced in a Greek cross and is placed in the same cardinal position as that of St. Peter's Basilica in Rome, to the east the altar of the Kings, to the west the main entrance called del Perdón or Papal, to the north the portada real, and to the south a simple portal without any adornment.

=== Towers ===
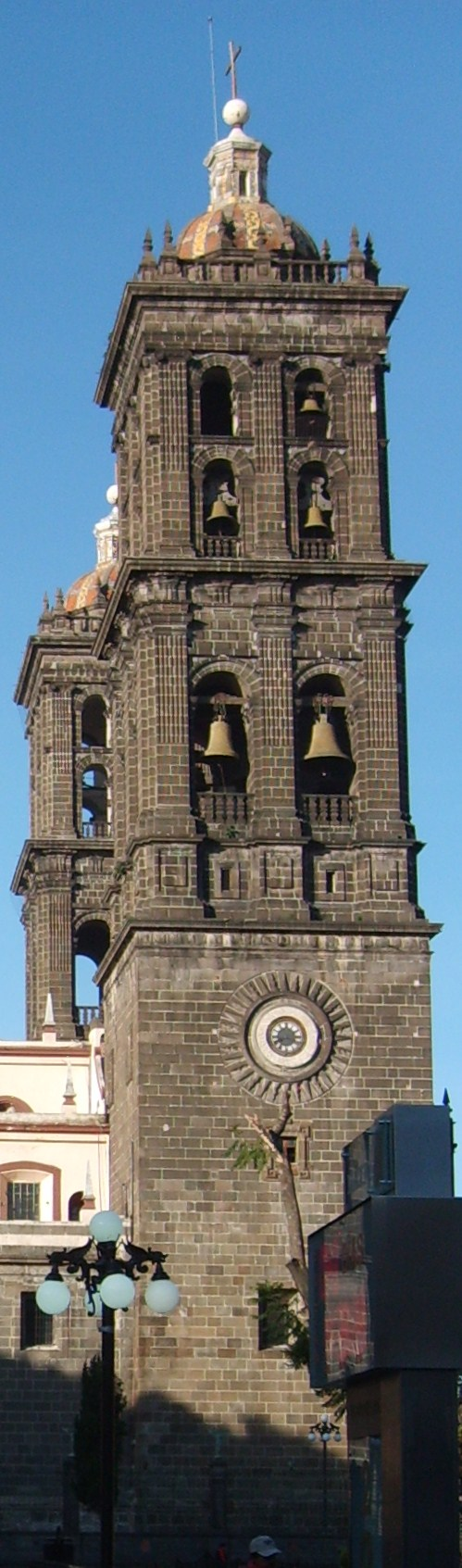
North tower of the cathedral called the Old Tower.

The north tower, the only one that has bells, also called the Old Tower, was finished in 1678 during the reign of Charles II of Spain, without cost of lives and under the charge of the major master Carlos García Durango, according to the inscription engraved on the inner wall of the first body of the tower. The south tower was built later in 1731 and opened on September 29, 1768, during the episcopal government of Francisco Fabián y Fuero. Both are 70 meters high, being at the time the highest in the American colonies.

The two towers at the front of the temple are equal and square, whose cubes are at the same height as the main façade, finished off with a cornice, above this rises the first body, which is of the Doric order with three pilasters on each front, and two arches for bells, one in each intercolumnium: these pilasters have their pedestals and receive the corresponding cornice, highlighting the architrave and carved friezes-rosettes on the cornice propecture, in the frieze there are triglyphs that lack metopes. The arches are of double proportion with their imposts, jambs and bands that garnish them, breaking these on the pedestal and secured with stonework balustrades, being all of this first body eight, the space between these and the cornice, is divided by a strip, the rest being bossage.

The second body follows, slightly narrowed in width, which is of the Ionic order and has three pilasters without a pedestal, but rather a plinth on each front, and thus these, like those on the first floor, are grooved and receive the cornice of the order to which they belong. This body, although it has almost the same height, was skillfully divided by its author into two parts in the middle, with an ergot with dentils, placing four arches on each front, two in the lower division with a balustrade, and the same number in the upper one without it, which is pleasing to the eye and avoided the many subdivisions so repeated in the architectural bodies.

This cornice is crowned by a sober balustrade intersected with pedestals in the corners and in the median of the fronts, in which round pyramidal merlons finish off, followed by an octagonal plinth, three times higher than the balustrade, which in each angle has a merlon like the previous ones, leaving these higher than the others and in the middle of them.

The towers are topped by domes of brick and azulejos topped with a roof lantern crowned by a white stone scotia called Villería (variety of opaque white marble) that supports a globe of the same stone approximately 1 meter in diameter, ending with a cross three meters high.

==== Bells ====
The Old Tower is the only one that has bells totaling ten, eight esquilas or smaller bells and a bell for the clock. The heaviest and most famous is the so-called "Campana María" the maximum registered weight of this with its clapper is 8 tons 572 kilos and 572 grams. The challenge and the tremendous difficulties involved in raising the María bell through a narrow opening gave rise to the famous legend that it was the angels who raised it and held it in place. The reality is that it was raised on the day of Saint Mark in 1732 by the Indian Juan Bautista Santiago, major master in charge of the works.

Some memorable chimes

The cathedral bells have rung on special occasions such as coronations of kings and births of the crown's first-born, however, history records the peals in independent Mexico as memorable:

On August 2, 1821 with the entry of the Army of the Three Guarantees headed by Agustín de Iturbide.
On the afternoon of May 5, 1862, when a tremendous downpour ended and the troops of the French army began to withdraw, according to the chronicles, "virtually no one slept that night in Puebla when the celebration for the victory began... with great ringing and fluttering of bells"
On May 5, 1962, at noon, in commemoration of the First Centenary of the Battle of Loreto y Guadalupe.
On October 30, 1964, the fall of Governor Nava Castillo due to the unpopularity of his government.
On Sunday, January 28, 1979, for the arrival of Pope John Paul II in the center of the city, passing in an open car, to one side of the north side of the cathedral.

=== Facades ===
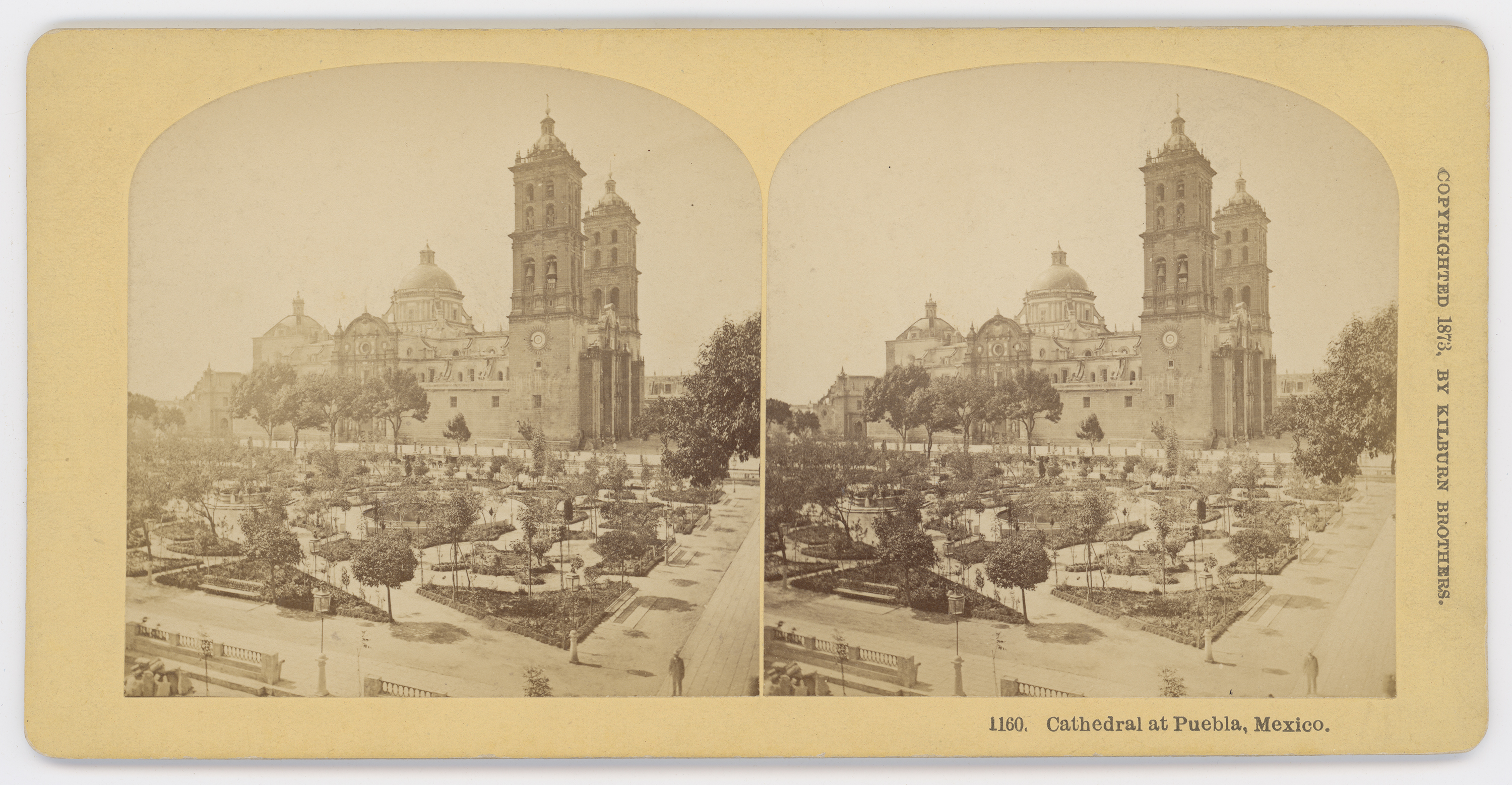
The Cathedral of Puebla in 1873.

The cathedral has five portals with access to the interior, one on both sides, three on the front, and all obey a sober Renaissance style.

==== Puerta del Perdón and sides ====
The middle one, which protects the so-called "Puerta del Perdón", rises 34 meters and opens only on big occasions, the same as in the Mexico City Cathedral and others. It was finished in 1664. This portal is divided into three bodies: the first of the Doric order with four fluted half columns with their pedestals and cornice, in the intercolumns there are two well-crafted niches, with two stone statues of Villería, one of Saint Peter with book and key; and that of Saint Paul with the sword, in the middle the Puerta del Perdón whose impost runs above the niches and between it and the cornice there are some shields of Villería with the shields of the cathedral: a vase of lilies, symbol of the Immaculate Conception of Mary. The second body is of the Ionic order, with four half columns and in its intercolumns there are niches and shields like the first with the statues of Saint Joseph, holding the baby Jesus by the hand on the left, and Saint James the Great on the right with a gourd on a staff and above a pine. The third body consists of two fluted Doric half-columns on pedestals and its cornice without pediment is topped with the arms of Spain, which from 1827 to 1930 was covered with mixture with the intention of putting the Mexican shield, however, and finally the place bears the Mary's monogram but keeping the golden fleece and the royal crown.

Adjoining the Puerta del Perdón, on both sides, are two posts that end in a semicircular point and ergot. When the archbishopric of Puebla was erected in 1904 by bull of Pius X, two commemorative plaques were installed on the poles with Latin inscriptions, one of them (on the left) referring to the first bishop Julián Garcés and the other (right) to the last bishop and first Archbishop Ramón Ibarra y González.

The side portals both show a relief with its Villería frames, on the left it represents Saint Rose of Lima receiving roses from the Virgin and a shield that says (Cordis mei rosa) Rose of my heart, and on the right Saint Teresa of Ávila in the moments in which an angel wounds her with an arrow in the heart (religious ecstasy), the shield on her left says (Vulnerasti cor meu) you hurt my heart and the one on her right (Amore langueo) consumes me of love.

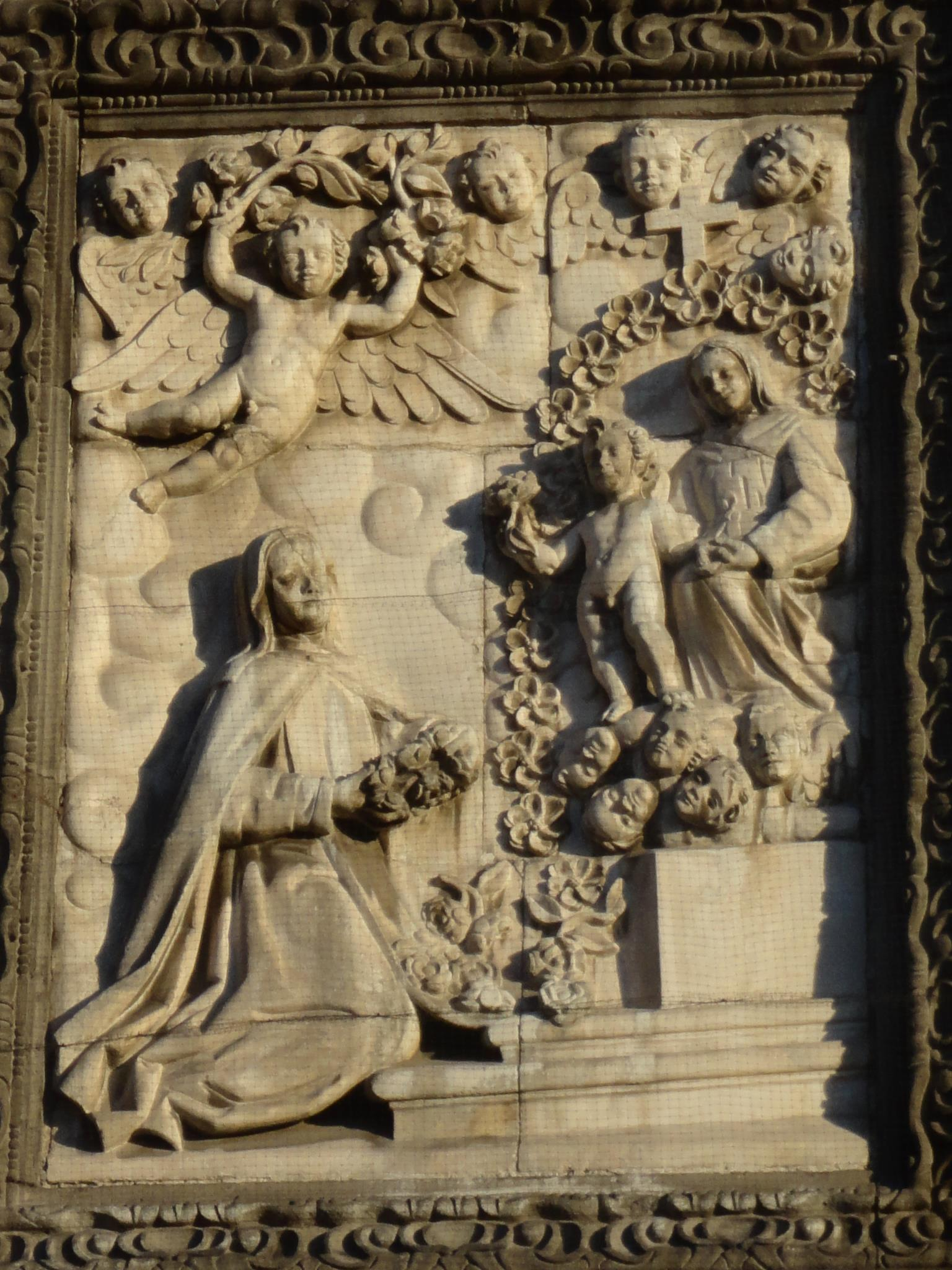
High relief of Saint Rose of Lima in stone of Villerías

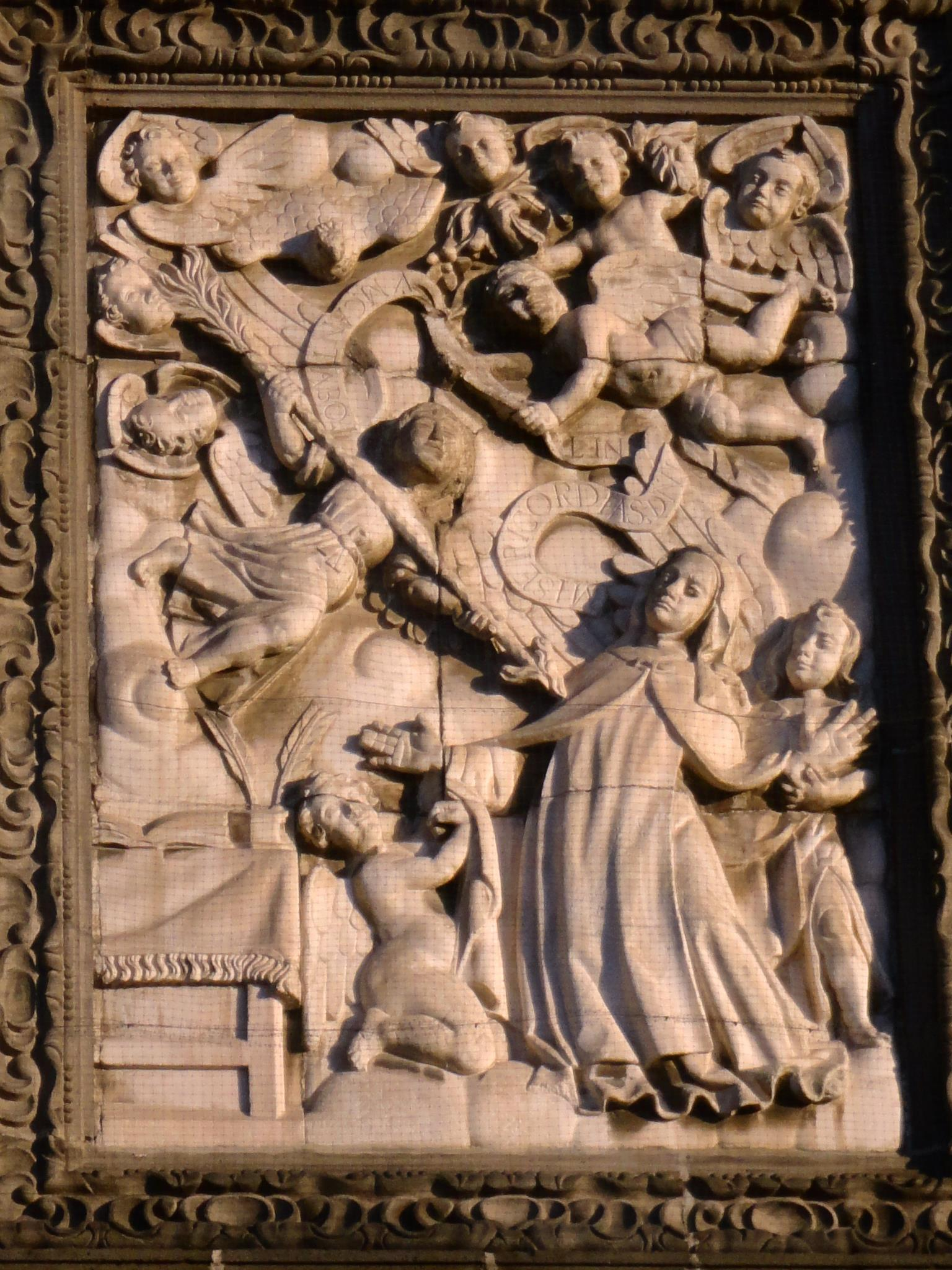
Religious ecstasy of Saint Teresa of Ávila

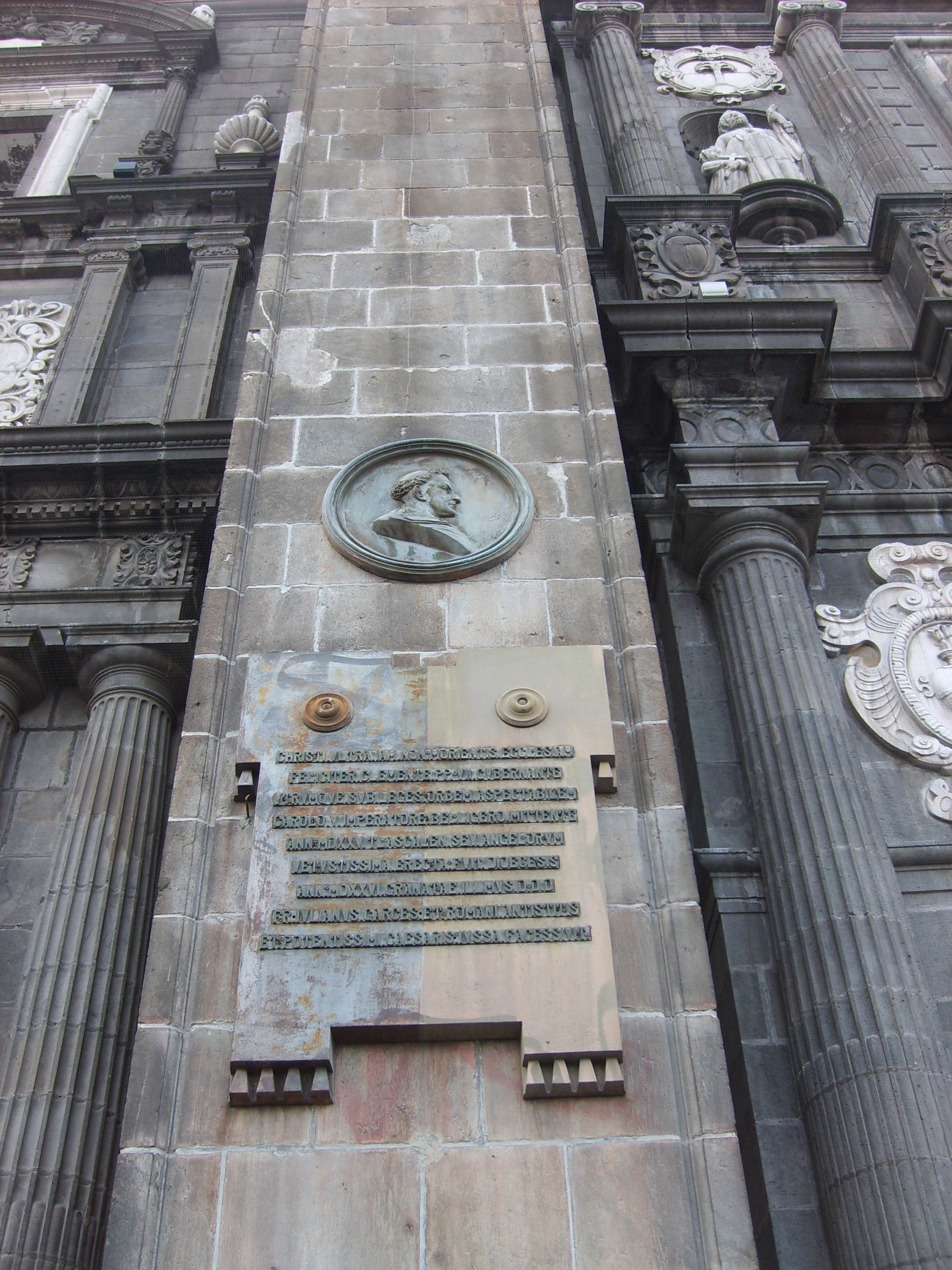
Julián Garcés first bishop of the diocese of Puebla de los Ángeles

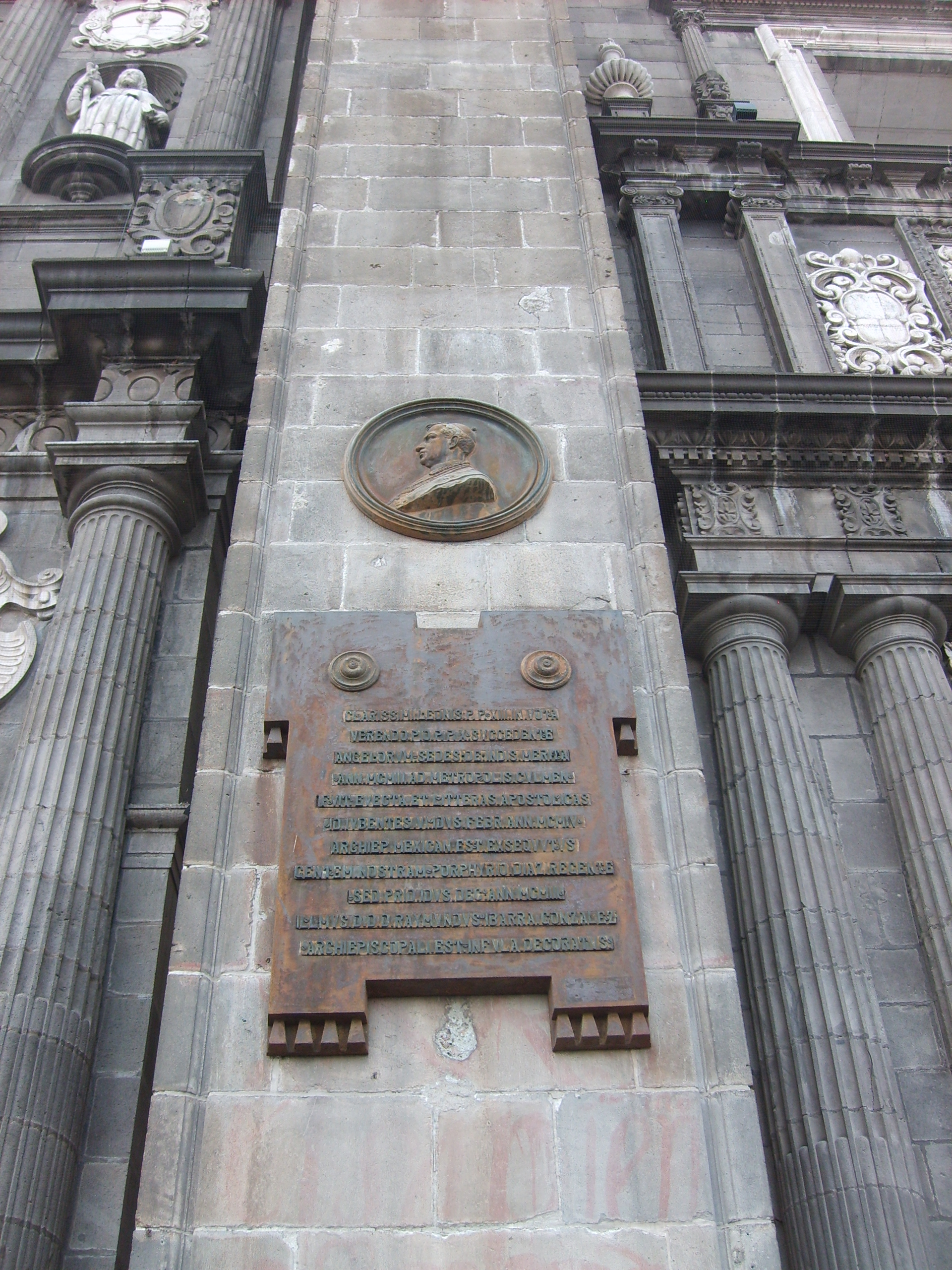
Ramón Ibarra y González last bishop and first archbishop of Puebla

==== Norte and Sur side portals ====
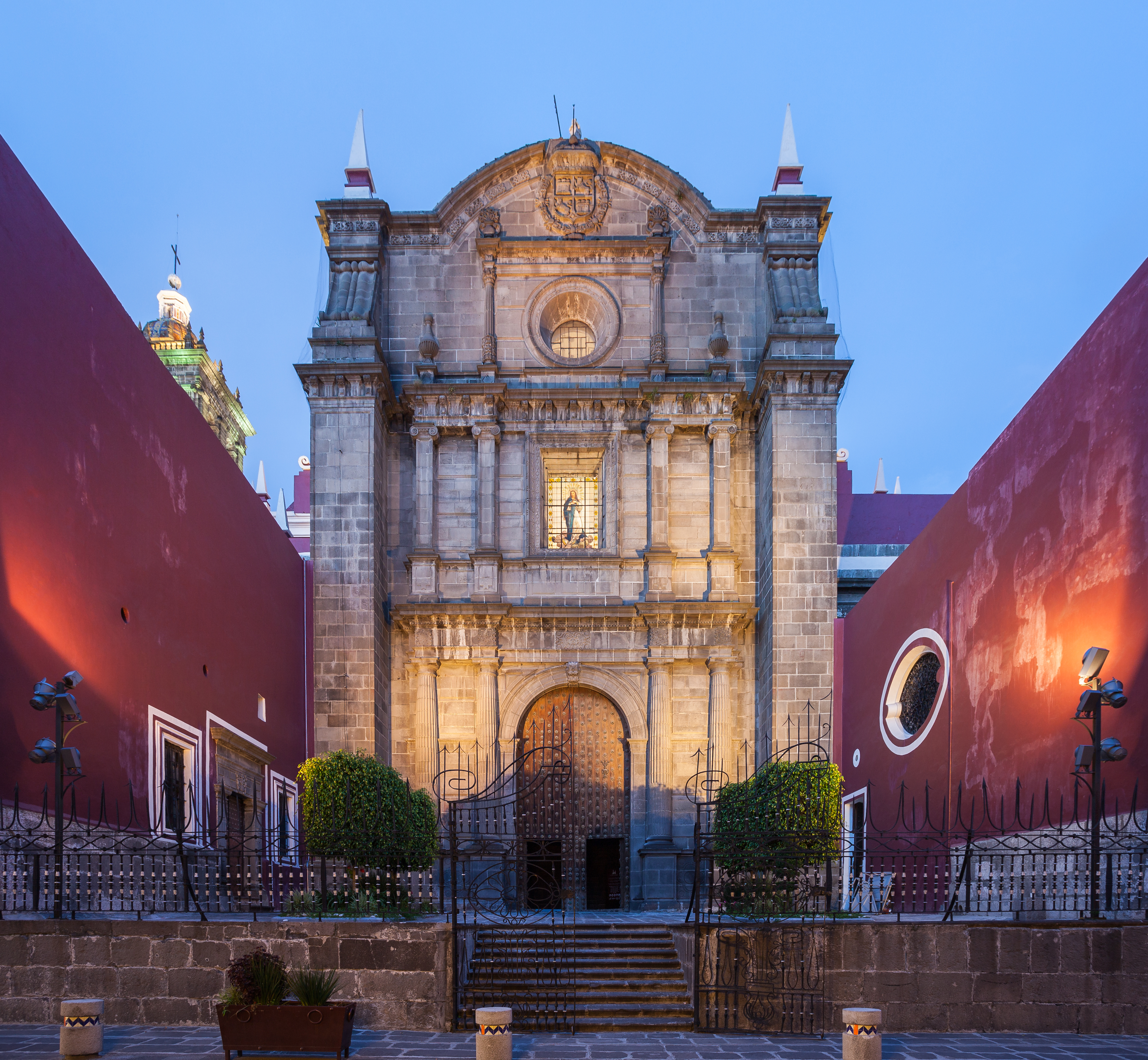
Portal Sur.

The door that leads to the Plaza Mayor is called San Cristóbal by Saint Christopher who is patron, among other things, of all entrances and exits, since there was behind the door a gigantic statue made of wood of this saint since the inauguration of the cathedral (1649) until the times of the intendant Manuel de Flon Conde de la Cadena (1786-1811) when it was removed, today in its place there is a large-format canvas of the same saint and the statue is kept in the Temple of Santiago.

The Norte and Sur portals are similar in architecture although they vary in details, the Sur being simpler without statues or decorations, the latter is located in front of the Casa de la Cultura, former Seminary, and its atrium is only as wide as the portal because it is boxed in on both sides by constructions of the same church. The grille of this access was built by José Mariano Saavedra. It was opened to the public in September 2010 after having been closed for more than 50 years.

The portal facing North (Norte) is approximately 30 meters high, consists of three bodies, the first is of the Doric order with four fluted columns and its capitals with carved ovos in its fourth bocel, finished off with well-proportioned cornices without triglyphs; in the intercolumnios there are ledges with well-defined niches topped with shells and in it there are two statues of Saint John the Evangelist and Saint Matthew the Apostle, life-size and of Villería; the impost of the arch runs to the sides, there are also medals with portraits of founding kings in low relief and white stone and of the same some children that adorn the spandrels of the arch.

The second body is of Ionic order that starts from an ornate pedestal, which constitutes four pilasters, two on each side, and in the center a window with a carved frame. The inter columns have niches and medals with the statues of Saint Luke and Saint Mark. It continues upwards with a cornice. The frieze is adorned with triglyphs and next to it runs two posts.

The top of the posts serves to receive an arch that covers the third and last body, this breaks from the cornice of the second and is formed by two Corinthian columns on pedestals with their cornice and frontispiece. The architecture of this portal is considered a masterpiece due to its stonework, which is why it is not without reason that it is engraved on the pedestal (Hoc opus, Hic labor).

==== Domes: Major and that of the Kings ====
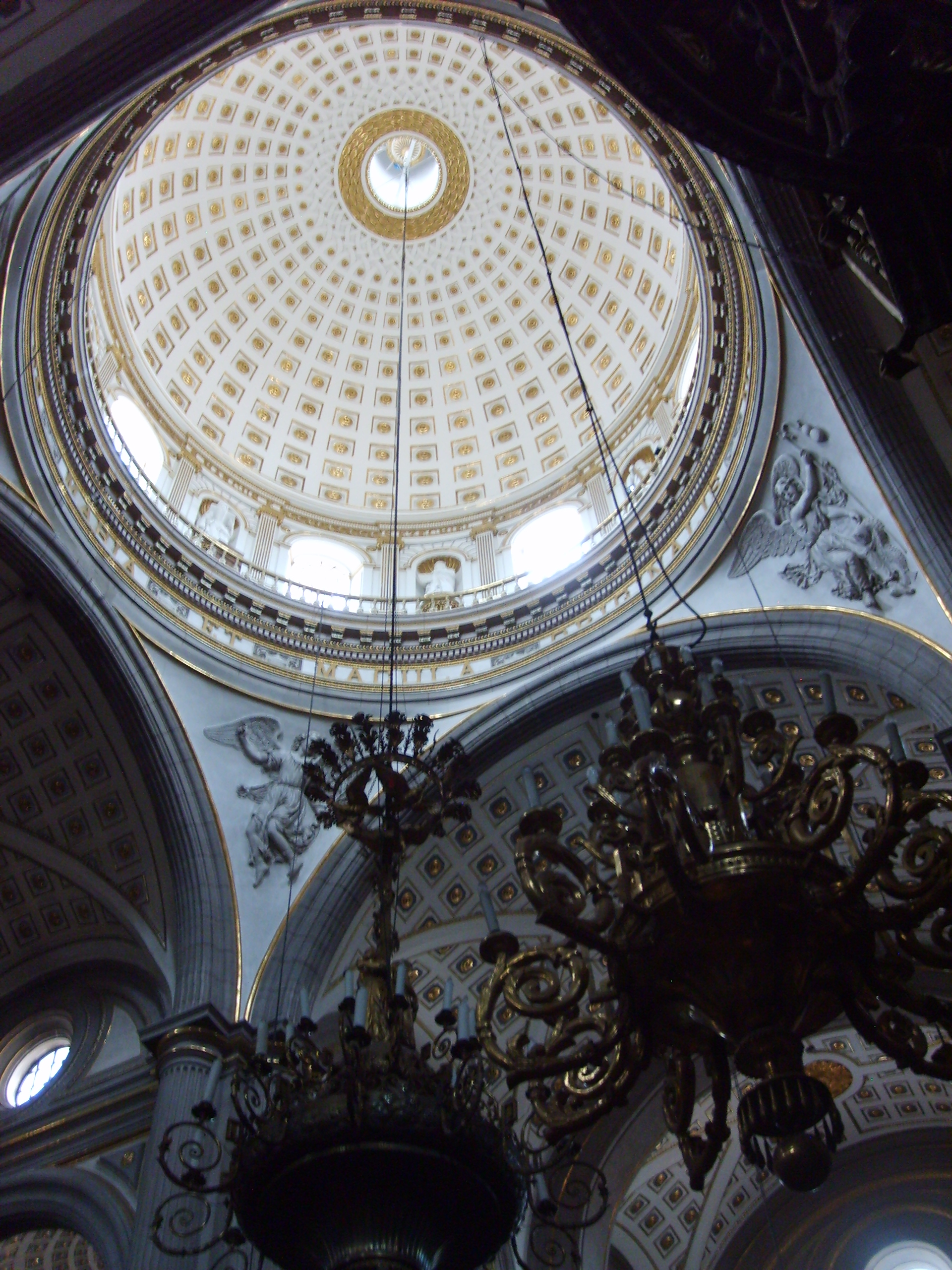
The main dome, which from the floor to its lantern is 43 m high, shows the evangelists and major prophets in the niches next to the windows, it is adorned with caissons and in its pendentives the stucco reliefs of the archangels Michael, Gabriel, Raphael and Uriel. The main lamp is made of tumbaga, the work of the Frenchman Georges Clere, in 1892.

It is half orange and rises majestically over the crossing, its octagonal basement with three Ionic pilasters at each angle and on its cornice on the four front walls there are as many windows, the exterior surface included a coating of yellow and green azulejos of terracotta in whose three quarters shine the same number of stars distributed at equal distances, and ends with a graceful cusp and a statuette of the Conception.

The dome of the Chapel of the Kings is smaller, its shell has four windows and as many stairs, between each one it ends with a statuette of Saint Joseph. This dome shines a lot at night when the church is illuminated.

=== Atrium ===
The place was probably occupied by the Major church, antecedent to the current one, which later, when it was demolished, the rubble remained for a time while the cathedral was being built, Veytia, who was born in 1718, saw them, and Bermúdez de Castro, born in 1746, describes them, but they no longer appear in the Plan of 1754. During the existence of the Major church in the 16th century, the chapel of the natives called the chapel of "San Pedro de los indios" was erected there, and next to it some priestly houses where the priests lived there being able to witness from their balcony the bullfights that took place opposite, there was also an ossuary for the bones that were taken from the Hospital de San Pedro.

Once these buildings disappeared according to a plan of 1754, a new chapel was built for the natives and at their expense, this time on one side of the south tower, it had the shape of a barrel made up of four vaults, its measurements are 6 m. high, 7.5 wide, and 15 m. long and was dedicated to "Las Lágrimas de San Pedro". It was known at the end of the 18th century and during the 19th as "Capilla de los Aguadores" and whose entrance was through the atrium. It was closed to worship in 1890, transferring the devotion to the Temple of Los Gozos. Its arches were canceled and today it is used as a cellar. In 1766, as in the old Major church, an underground place was built again in front of the chapel for the mortal remains of the natives.

In the 18th century, the entire atrium was paved with stairways for access and was surrounded by attic posts on whose cusps there were statues of saints and between the posts 17 Tuscan columns topped with lions and shields of white stone from Villería.

The current trellis began to be built in 1878, being financed in each section by private donors according to the red stone inscriptions that can be seen today.

== Interior ==
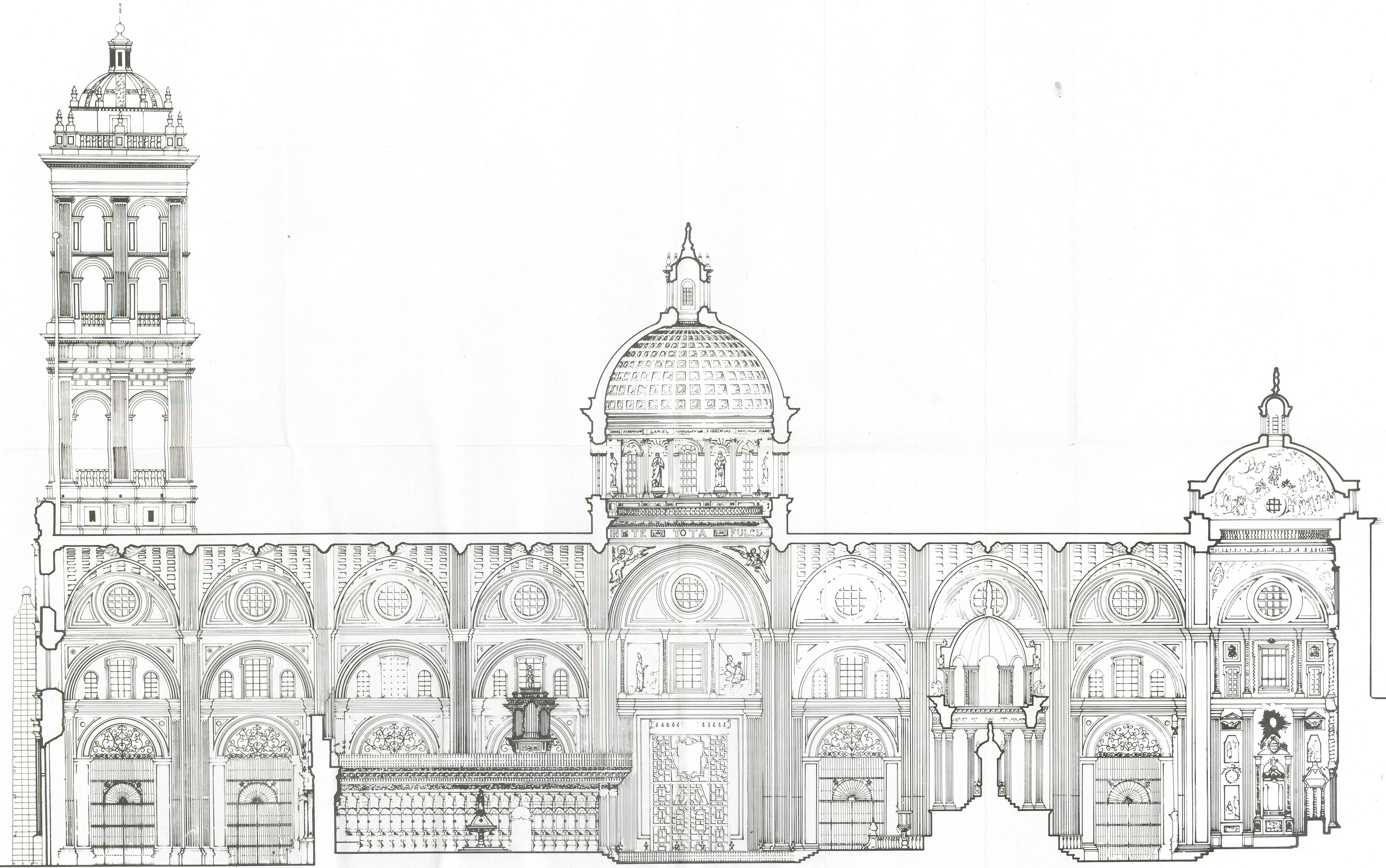
Section of the Basilica Cathedral and Sagrario (Tabernacle).

As has been said, the interior plan of the cathedral forms a parallelogram 97.67 meters long, from the façade (Puerta del Perdón) to the sidewalk of Calle 2 Sur, from West to East, by 51 meters wide, from South to North; if we have to consider only the cathedral temple without the Miter, that is to say, from the façade to the Altar of the Kings, the measurement is 82 meters. Five naves rise in this space in the form of a Greek cross: the main nave, the crossing nave, two processional naves and two for the chapels.

It has 14 colossal Doric style columns almost 15 meters high from the plinth to the capital, all fluted, 6 pilasters of the same height, supporting the vaults and arches of the upper nave and 18 columns embedded in the side walls of 9.78 meters from plinth to capital, they support the vaults of the lower naves. All the pillars carry the weight of forty vaults and two domes, all of which are made of gray quarry stone that was brought from the neighboring towns of the city and carved with such precision that the work seems error-free.

The 14 isolated columns that form the middle nave are not round, but form a square post with a column embedded in each face, taking this conception into account, we have a total of 74 columns and six pilasters. These support 12 visible main arches and 4 hidden ones, adding those of the lateral naves are a total of 30 visible and 4 embedded in the main walls.

The main body of the cathedral has two domes, one over the Altar of the Kings without a dome and another with it in the crossing, the largest of all, in addition to 14 spherical or half-plate cupolas, which belong to the lateral naves; in addition, those of the chapels must be counted, which are 14 of the type of truncated vaulted ceiling or handkerchief, being a total of 39, all adorned with their rosettes in the middle and golden coffers ordered from largest to smallest towards the vertices that are covered fleurons with nail and in turn the medallions hang on each one along the temple and turning it. With the exception of the shell of the largest dome made of pumice stone to lighten its weight, lime and stone were used in the others. (Note: Combination of stones and slaked lime with which some walls are built.)

Eight niches with sculptures of the prophets and evangelists in white stucco are found in the drum of the main dome. Its creator was the Spanish architect and sculptor Pedro García Ferrer, nephew of Bishop Palafox.

The paving is of alternating red and black marble,'0 called Santo Tomás. The building is illuminated by 124 windows, of which 27 are round, using 2,215 panes that were originally placed in 1664.

=== Altars of the Gospel and the Epistle ===
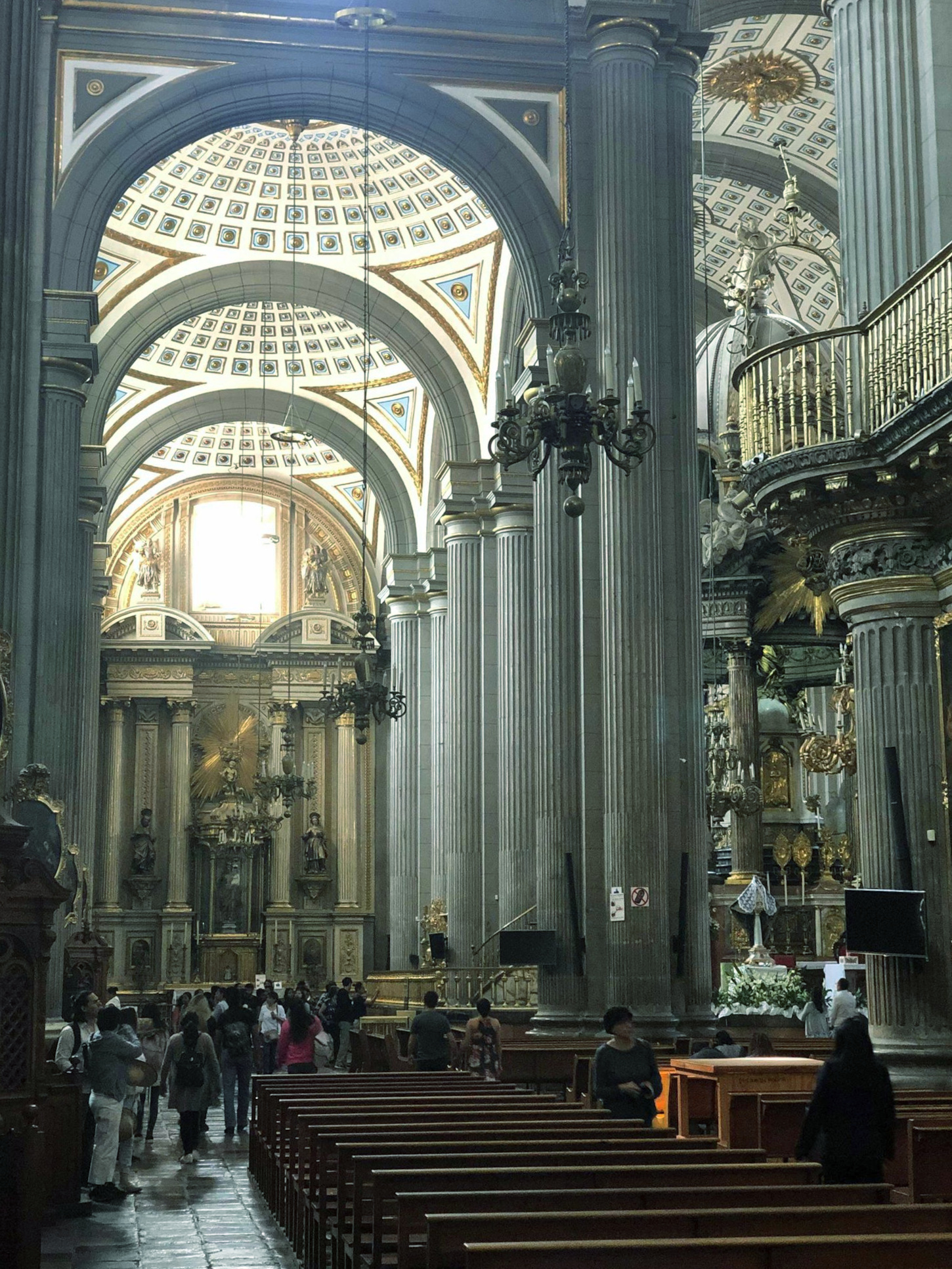
The processional nave of the Gospel, in the background the altar dedicated to Saint Joseph, on the left paintings of the Stations of the Cross made by Miguel Cabrera and on the right the Choir.

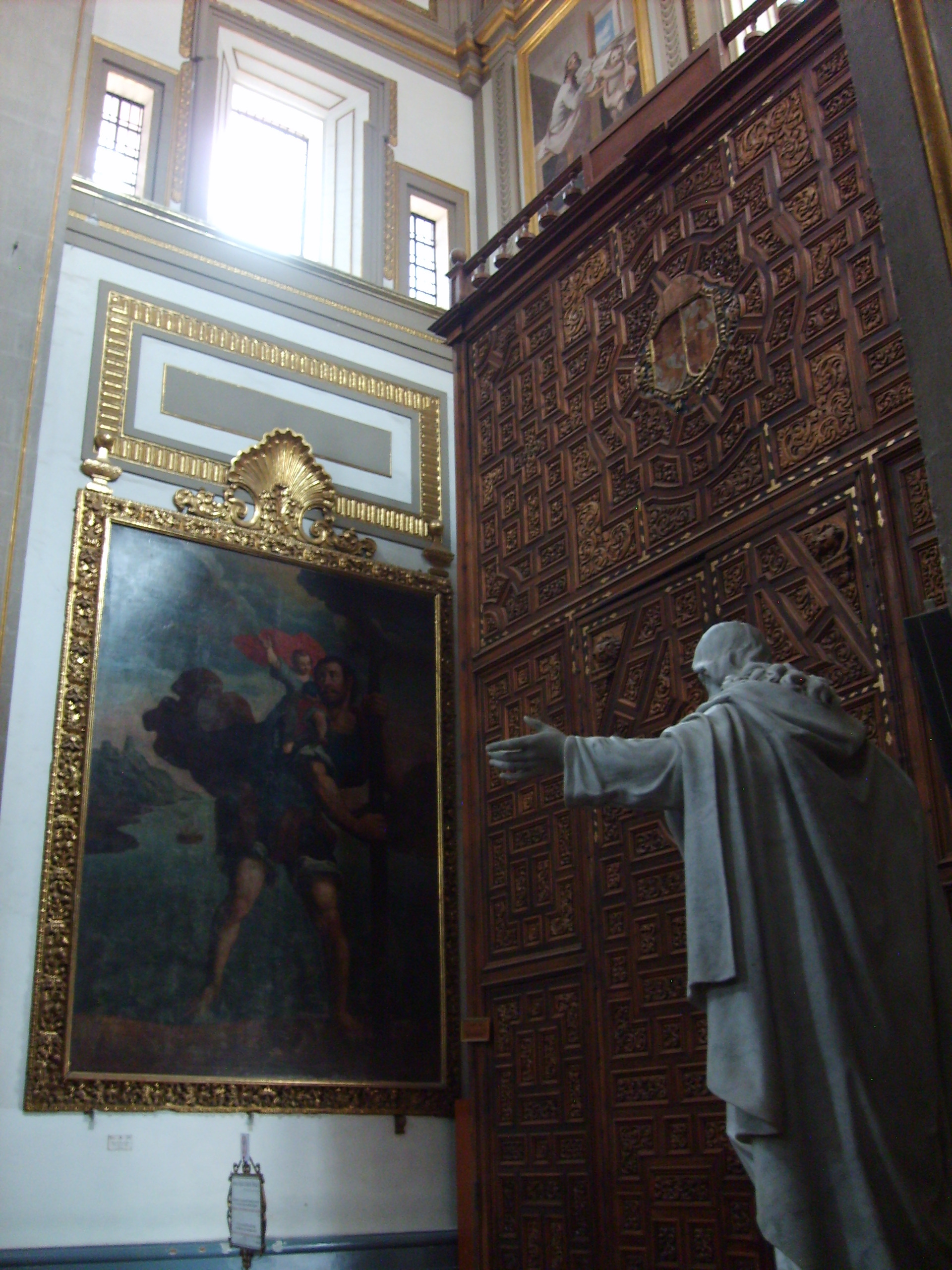
Cancellation of the door of San Cristóbal and painting of the saint, by the author Lara and the Christ by the sculptor José Zacarías Cora.

Each collateral nave has its altar at its head: the one on the Gospel side is dedicated to Saint Joseph and the one on the Epistle to Archangel Michael. These two altars are equally gilded and Corinthian order. They are made up of four large columns in the first body and two small ones in the second. Each altar has a large niche with crystals, inside of which are placed the images of the saints to whom they are dedicated, on beautiful silver bases and four bouquets of the same metal. The image of the Archangel Michael has his cane and other silver decorations, and on the sides in the intercolumnios, on some shelves, two statues of Archangel Gabriel and Archangel Raphael are placed on beautiful silver bases and their candle holders of the same metal; these figures being life-size.

The altar table has a silver front and supports a tabernacle more than a meter high made of the same metal, with a niche in the middle where a Christ by José Antonio Villegas Cora is placed, and others on the sides with various relics.

The altar of Saint Joseph, to the right of the Altar of the Kings, has the same silver decoration and the statues between the columns are of Joachim and Saint Anne. The one of Saint Joseph is by Cora. Another Holy Christ with the Virgin and Saint John is placed in the tabernacle of this altar.

- Stations of the Cross

The series of paintings that recount the Stations of the Cross located along both processional naves is the work of the famous 18th-century Oaxacan painter Miguel Cabrera.

- Transept

Through the access on the north side of the transept there is a large-format oil painting of Saint Christopher carrying the Child Jesus and in front of it is the archangel Michael by the 18th-century painter Luis Berrueco. On the south side the patronage of Saint Joseph is represented and on the opposite side Stages of the Life of Saint John Nepomucene, martyr of the secret of confession, by the 19th century painter Miguel Jerónimo Zendejas.

In the second body of the crossing naves, the four evangelists, Saint Matthew, Saint Mark, Saint John and Saint Luke, are represented in 19th-century tempera paintings by the Pueblan painter Julián Ordóñez, the doors' gates were assembled in cedar in the 17th century in the Mudéjar style that were completed by the 10th Bishop Diego Osorio de Escobar y Llamas and the architect Francisco Gutiérrez intervened in the regency of the work, highlighting three reliefs on the main gates: in the center the coat of arms of Spain, in the lateral ones that of the first bishop Friar Julián Garcés Romano and that of the 9th bishop Juan de Palafox y Mendoza.

=== Plan ===

1. Altar of the Catholic Monarchs.
2. High altar or baldachin (Cypress).
3. Choir and organs.
4. Chapel del Apóstol Santiago.
5. Chapel of San Pedro.
6. Chapel of Our Lady of Guadalupe.
7. Chapel del Sagrado Corazón de María.
8. Chapel of la Inmaculada Concepción.
9. Chapel del Señor de la Preciosa Sangre.
10. Chapel of San Nicolás De Bari.
11. Chapel of Nuestra Señora de los Dolores.
12. Chapel del Sagrado Corazón de Jesús.
13. Chapel of las Santas Reliquias.
14. Chapel of San Juan Nepomuceno.
15. Chapel del Señor de la Columna.
16. Chapel of la Virgen de Ocotlán.
17. Chapel of Nuestra Señora de la Soledad.
18. Tabernacle.
19. Sacristy.
20. Hall of los Gobelinos.
21. Chapter House
22. Hall of the Cathedral Chapter
23. Archive.
24. Chapel del Espíritu Santo (Ochavo).

=== Altar of the Kings ===
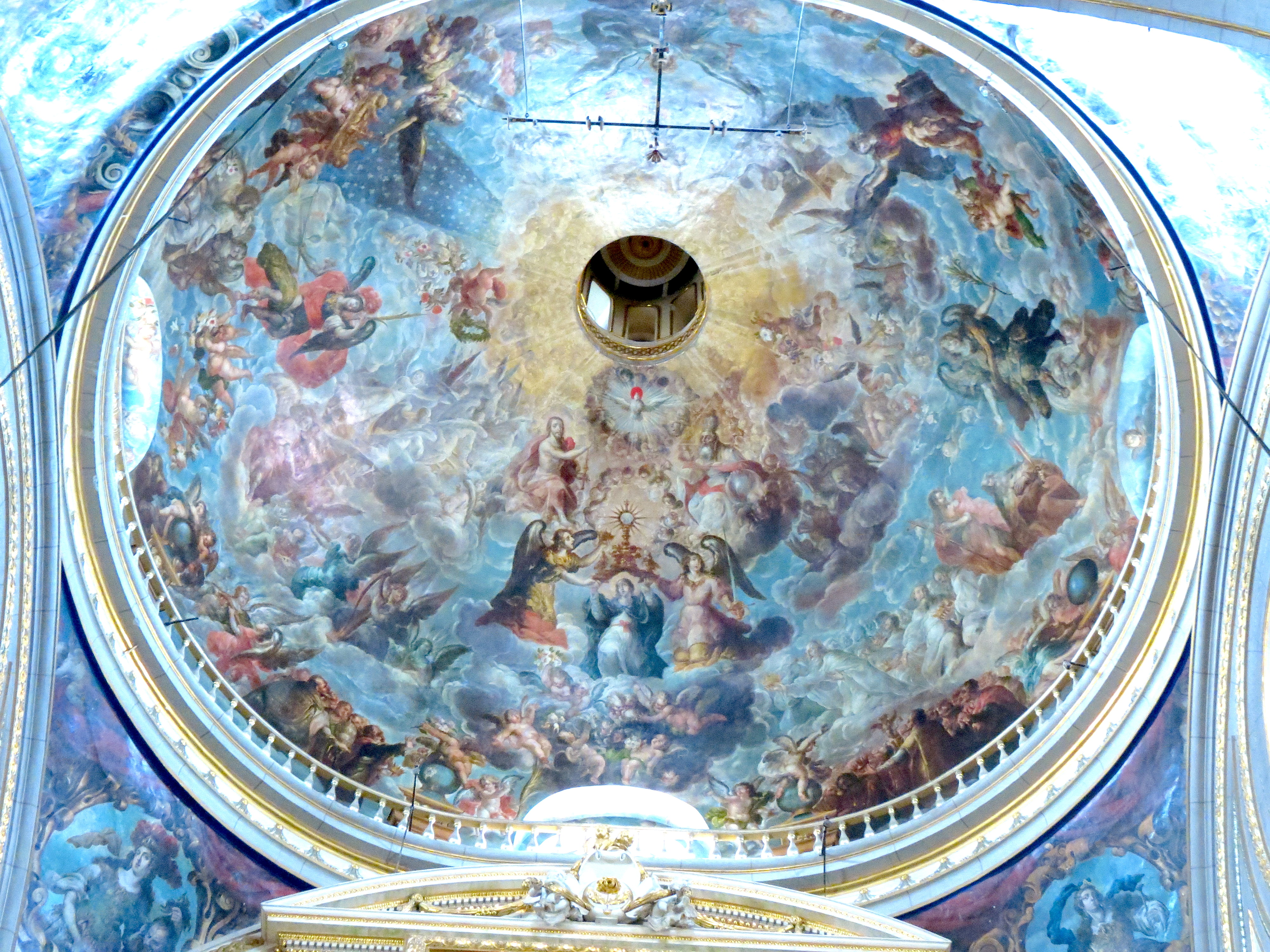
The tempera painting of the dome of the Altar of the Kings is the work of the Baroque artist Cristóbal de Villalpando in 1688.

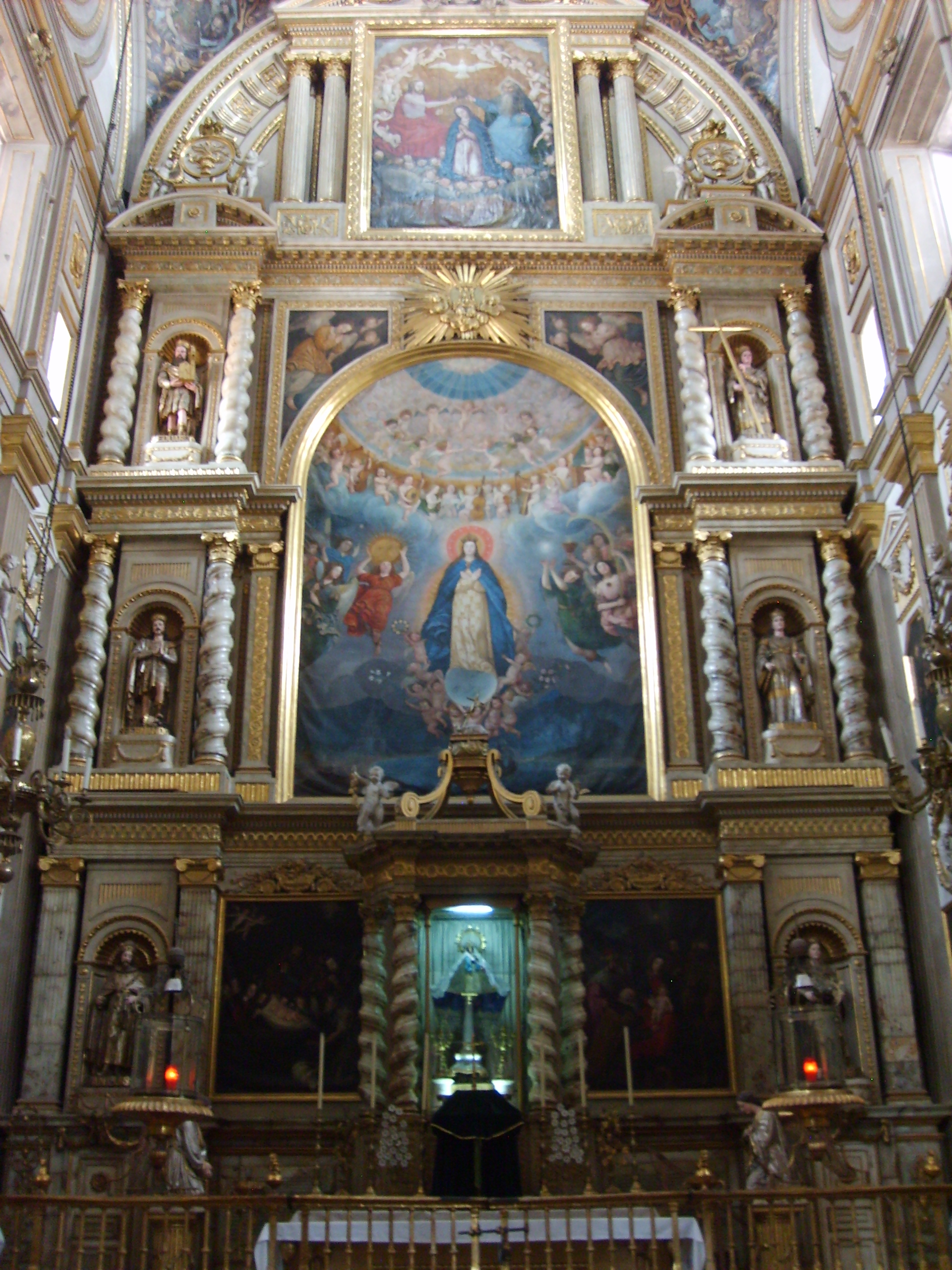
Reredos of the Altar of the Kings.

It gets its name from the images of holy kings and queens in the lateral niches of its reredos. The complex is made up of a dome on pendentives, a main altarpiece, two side reredos and the tabernacle. The chapel was designed by the Spaniard Juan Martínez Montañés and its main altarpiece in Solomonic Baroque style was the work of master Lucas Méndez under the direction of Pedro García Ferrer, and inspired by a sketch by Sebastián de Arteaga, it was consecrated on April 18, 1649. by Bishop Palafox and its factory lasted seven years.

The sumptuous painting of the dome is one of the few tempera paintings preserved in Mexico and that consecrates the triumph of the Eucharist, it is the work of the Baroque painter Cristóbal de Villalpando made in the year 1688, commissioned by Bishop Manuel Fernández de Santa Cruz, achieving a large set of figures in bright colors in the manner of the great Italian masters of the seventeenth century. He himself decorated the pendentives with images of the four Jewish heroines Judith, Ruth, Esther and Jael, strong women decked out in the elitist manner of the 17th century.

The fourth body and auction is made up of the oil painting of the Coronation of the Virgin Mary by the Holy Trinity placed between paired columns of the compound order, the large central space is made up of the second and third body with Solomonic columns, it is occupied by the oil painting of the Assumption of Mary, on the left side intercolumns Edward the Confessor and Ferdinand III of Castile on the right side Helena of Constantinople, mother of Emperor Constantine, and Margaret Queen of Scotland.

The first body is made up of square pilasters and Ionic capitals and in each intercolumnium the sculptures of Louis IX of France and Saint Elizabeth, Queen of Hungary, in the middle part of this body is the Tabernacle with four Solomonic columns, in the glass niche there is the image of Our Lady of Defense on a base and silver column, in the collaterals of this tabernacle there are two oil paintings: the birth of the Child Jesus where the 9th bishop of Puebla Juan de Palafox y Mendoza is represented and the adoration of the Saints Magi Kings. All the paintings on this altar, with the exception of the dome, were made by the Spanish architect and painter Pedro García Ferrer, a close relative of Bishop Juan de Palafox.

=== High altar ===
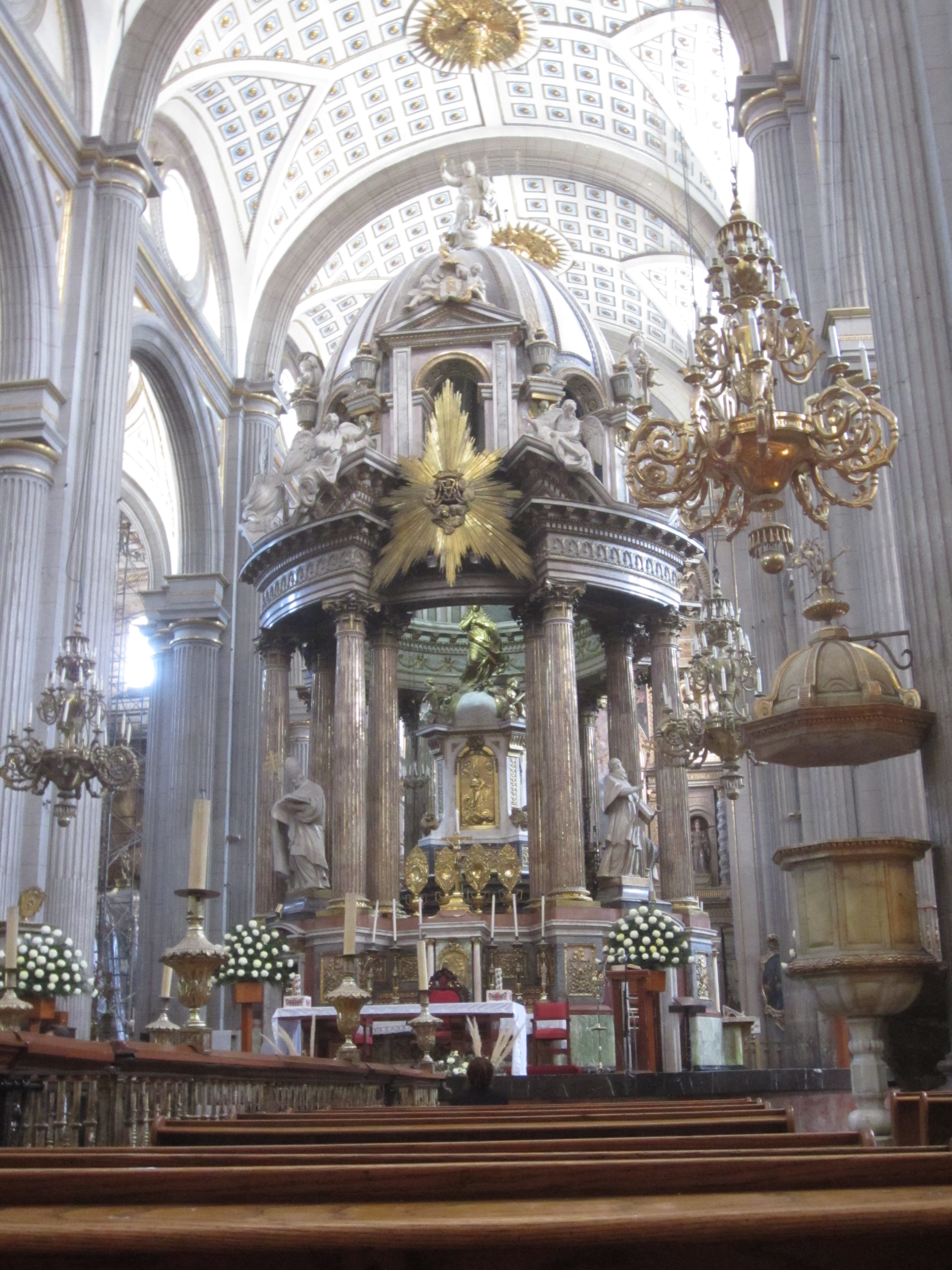
The cypress, built between 1799 and 1819, the work of Manuel Tolsá, focuses on the bronze figure of the Immaculate Conception, 2 meters high and weighing almost a ton.

The ninth bishop, Juan de Palafox y Mendoza, had collected the spoils of his predecessors in the year 1649, which were in other churches in Puebla and thus began the pantheon of bishops in the old tabernacle. Around the year 1798, when Salvador Bienpica y Sotomayor was bishop, they tried to make a new one and it was thought to be made of silver, but this idea was discarded and later Manuel Tolsá, director of sculpture at the Academy of Mexico, was consulted who agreed to make the plan and model; once contracted, the demolition was carried out on September 1, 1799, beginning the new work with enormous expenses, after some changes in the administration, the architect José Manzo took over the direction. They worked hard and without consideration of expenses until completing the splendid work that kept the people of Puebla in expectation for 20 years. The current main altar, called Cypress, was blessed on December 5, 1819. The burial and transfer of the mortal remains of the Angelopolitan bishops to the bishops' crypt took place on May 14, 1824. The main artists who worked on it, in addition to Tolsá and Manzo, were: Pedro Patiño Ixtolinque, master Pedro Pablo Lezama in the work of marble and masonry, José Ramírez in stucco; The bronze and silver work was done in Mexico by Manuel Camaño, the chiseled Joaquín de Izunsa and the silversmith Simón Salmón who, among other works, cast the beautiful image of the Immaculate Conception of Tolsá. The ambons for the readings and the pulpit were the work of Joseph de Medina in 1719.

- Architecture

The height of the Cypress, from the ground to the head of the statue of Saint Peter, is 17.50 meters. It is a Neoclassical style building with the influence of ancient Roman architecture of its time of decline, which involves volumetric searches breaking into complicated entablatures and pediments to the counterpoint of straight lines and curves, in this monument there is a wide variety of materials such as Tecali marble, stucco, bronze, brass and cedar wood in the crypts.

This cypress is placed on a stone pedestal 2.61 meters high in square and sits on a circular plan of Corinthian order forming an open tower with four fronts. The first body is made up of 16 fluted Corinthian columns, 5.66 meters high, grouped by four at each angle that enclose the doctors of the church in white stucco, Saint Gregory, Saint Ambrose, Saint Augustine and Saint Jerome.

The cornice is interrupted in each section of the pillars to house in its gaps large gleams with the anagram of the Virgin Mary and stucco finials of angels, on the dome a Saint Peter surrounded by seraphim and clouds in white stucco finishes off, the lower part it was decorated in a very sumptuous way in keeping with the rest of the monument, the building leaves a large hollow space for the tabernacle and the Immaculate Conception, it is classified by means of a stepped plinth with eight sides that mark corner pilasters and have gilded doors in their openings, it is closed by a better half and culminates with the statue of the Immaculate Virgin who steps on the biblical serpent in the clouds, it was cast in bronze and weighs 920 kilograms. The base of the cypress, in a round shape and with a flat vault, where there are four small doors for access to the crypts of the bishops, are only opened on November 2, the All Souls' Day.

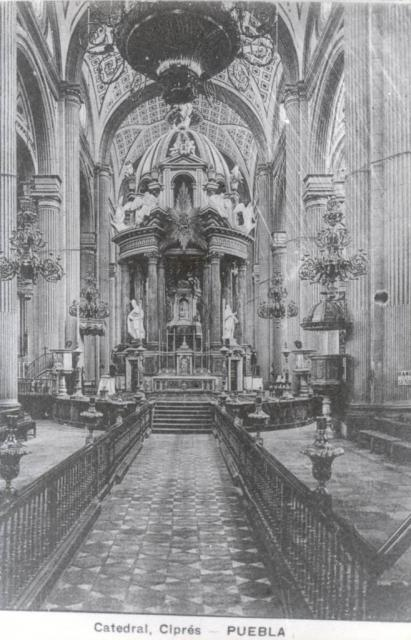
Cypress of the cathedral in 1900.

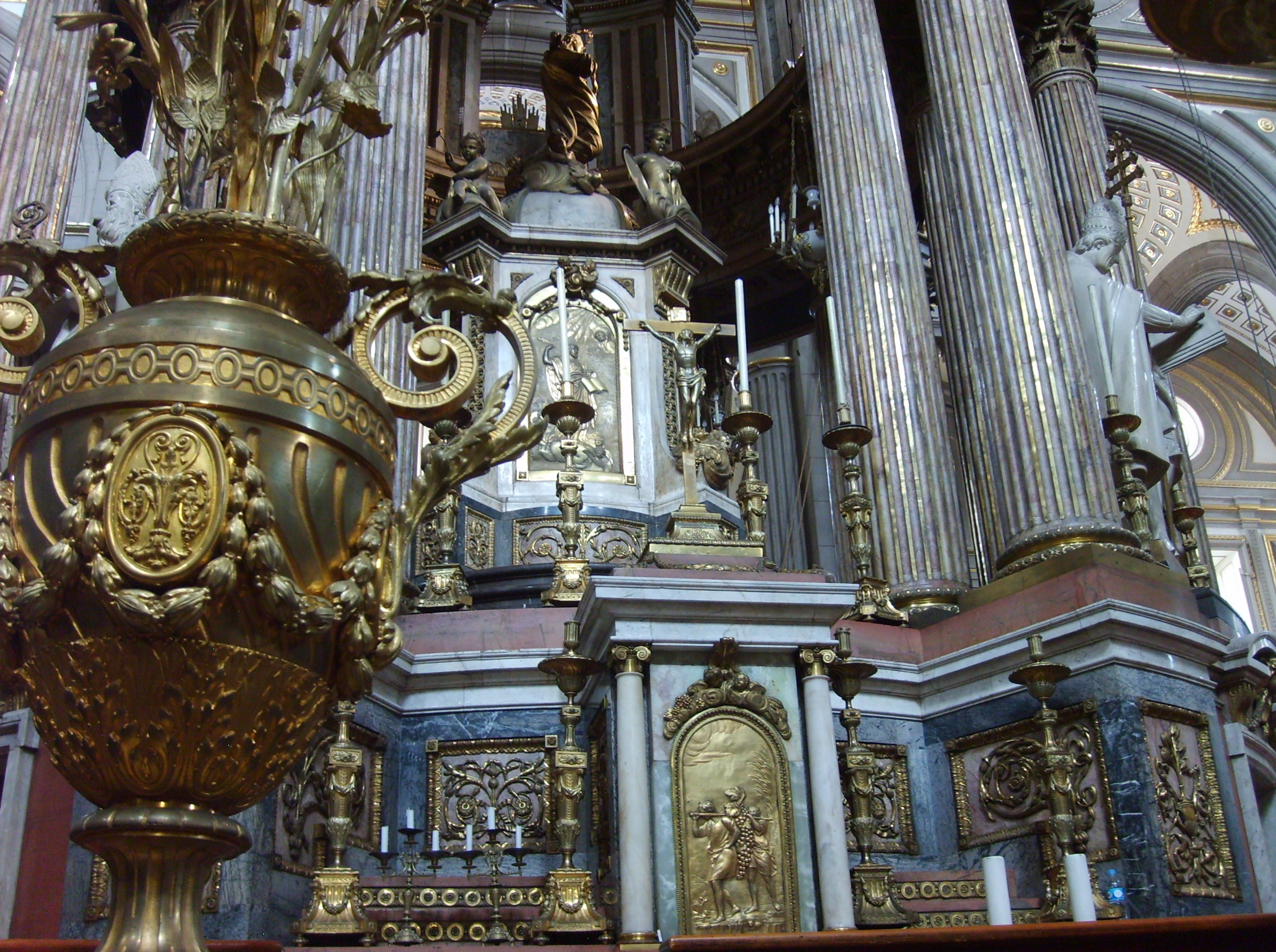

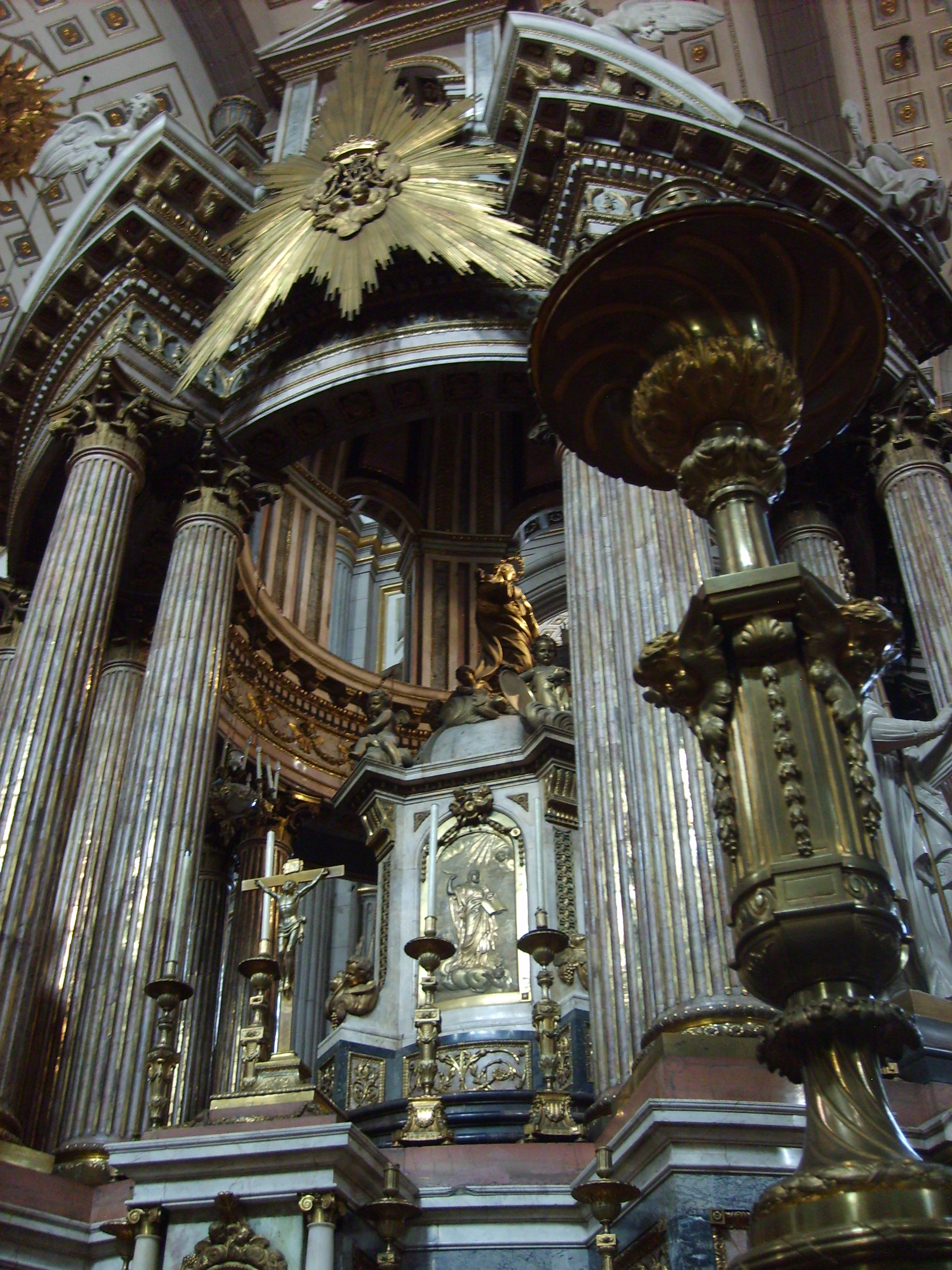

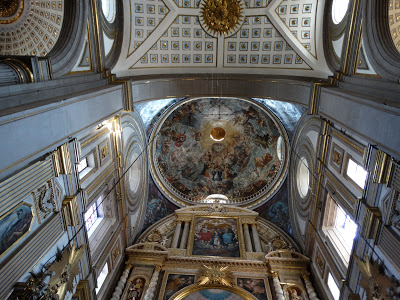

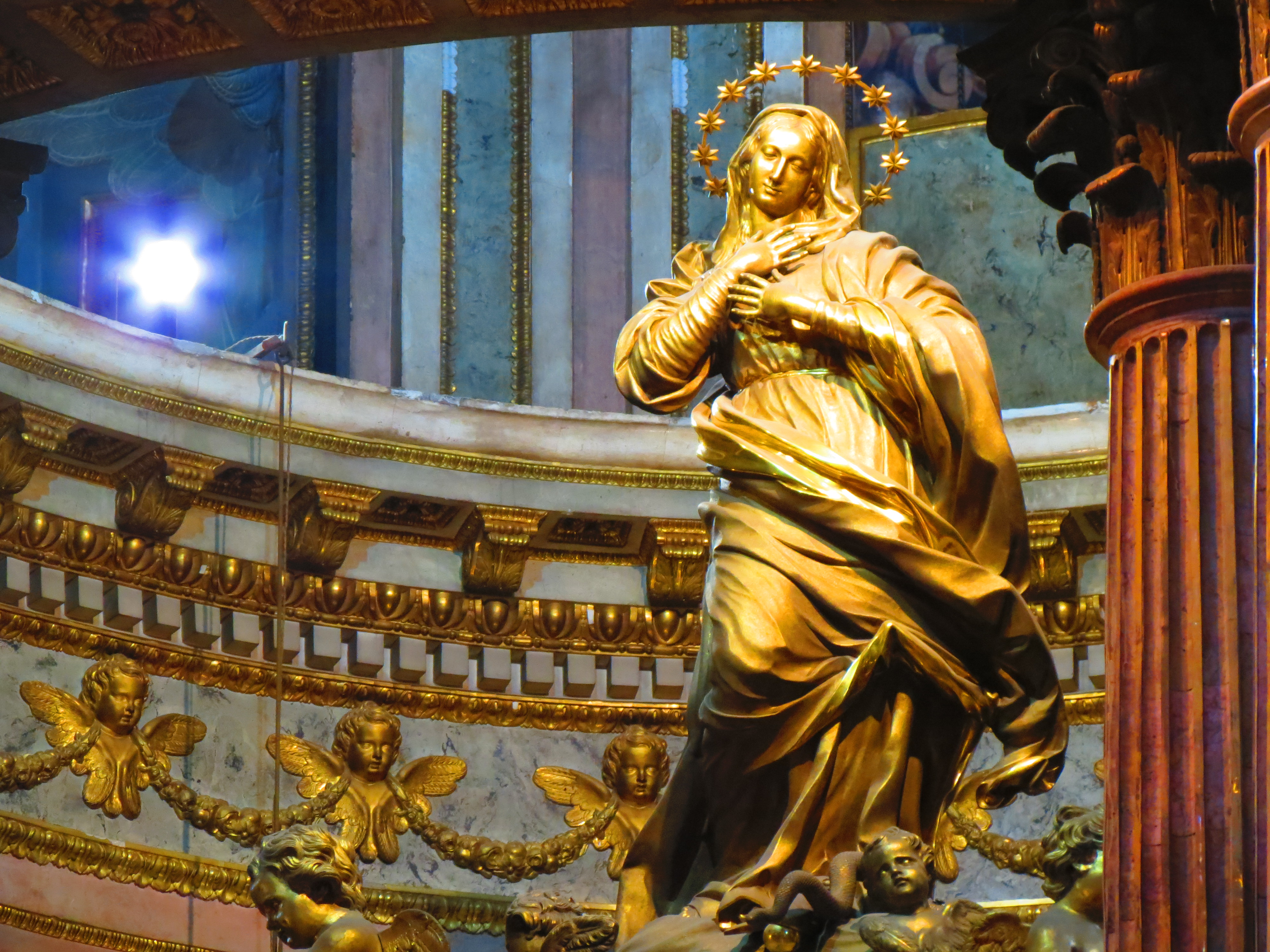

=== Choir ===
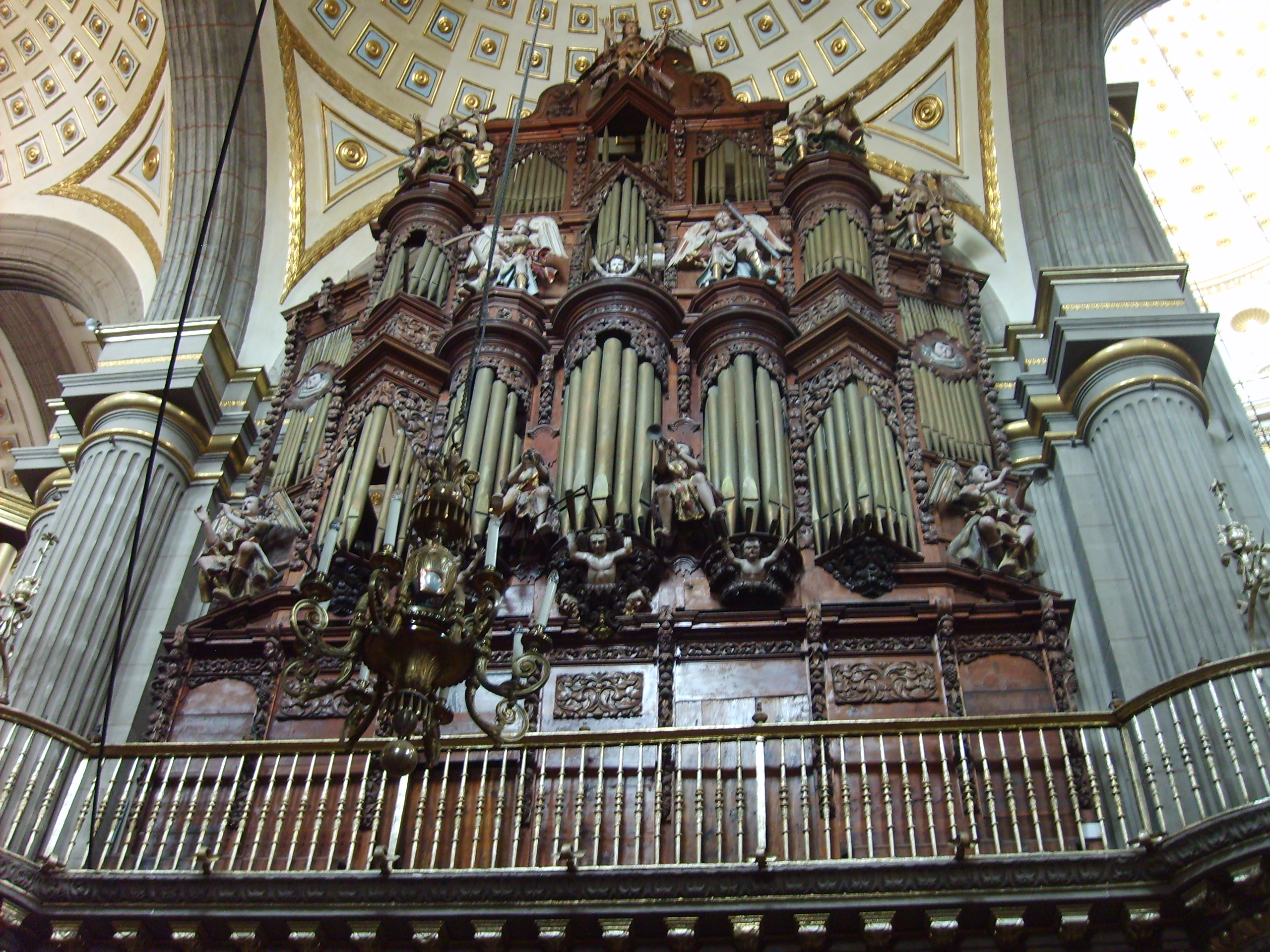
The second organ built in 1737.

The Choir that is located in front of the Puerta del Perdón, was built in the last decade of the 17th century and the beginning of the 18th century with the purpose that this place was destined for the oratory of the cathedral chapter de Puebla, for which the installation was required, in successive periods, of organs for the harmonization of ceremonies.

The Choir is made up of three large walls that open in the shape of a horseshoe in the direction of the high altar, the space it creates is closed by a 17th-century wrought Pueblan iron gate by master Juan Mateo de la Cruz that ends with the Calvary in ivory and in the collaterals, the bell towers. The interior is made up of 52 chairs in two exclusive rows for the ecclesiastical council, the stalls are made of beautiful Pueblan marquetry, with fine wood, bone and ivory forming different grecados, on the backs of each chair. The two small doors that give access to the choir were inlaid on both sides and with reliefs of Saint Peter and Saint Paul; these stalls and doors were donated by the 14th bishop Pedro Nogales Dávila and worked in the eighteenth century by the master Pedro Muñoz, in the center of the choir on a tecali stone baluster there is a cedar lectern where it supports four books of the 16th century with Gregorian music and engravings by Luis Lagarto, this beautiful lectern finishes off the statue of Saint John of Nepomuk martyr of the secret of confession and patron saint of priests.

- Organs

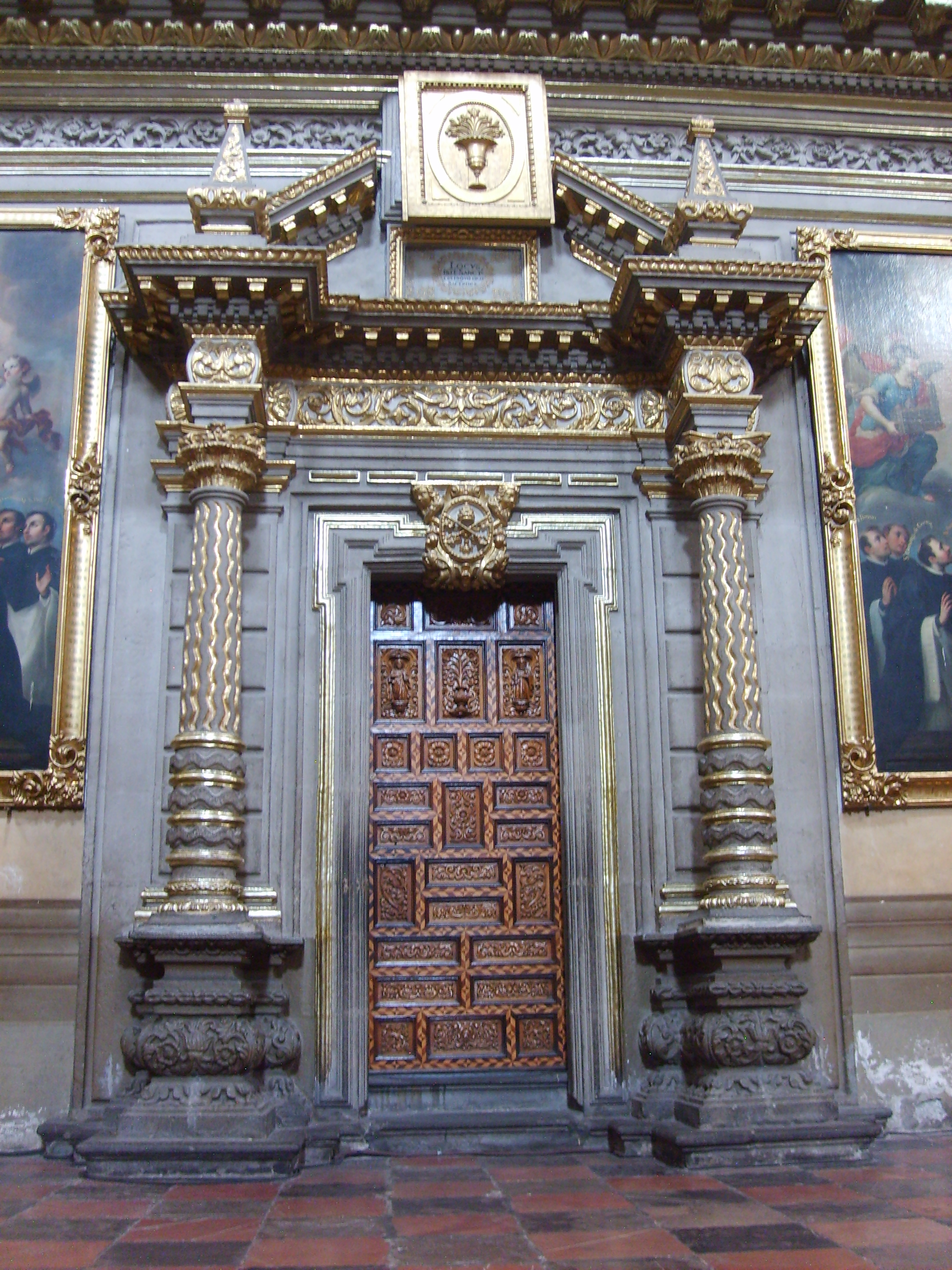
Retrochoir door.

The organs that make up the choral ensemble are three: the first, whose main decoration faces the epistle nave or right-hand processional nave, dates from the 18th century, was built from 1710 to 1719 by Félix Izaguirre, and is no longer in use today, the second old organ it was built by Inocencio Maldonado in 1737; The third organ that looks towards the front of the baldachin and towards the Altar del Perdón is the largest in this cathedral it has been given the name "International" because three nations participated in its construction: the United States in 1958, in the city of Buffalo the electronic part with four keyboards was built, Germany the artistic and gilded pipes and Mexico the assembly of cedar wood and gold leaf decoration. It was assembled inside the cathedral by artists from Puebla.

The so-called International organ has a total of 3376 pipes or musical sounds, it is electro-pneumatic based on turbines and electricity, the largest tube measures 12 m and the smallest 1 cm, it plays on big occasions such as weddings, graduations, concerts, etc. It was inaugurated on December 8, 1973, by Archbishop Octaviano Márquez y Toriz. Of the three organs, the two old ones are no longer in service since they stopped working at the end of the 19th century and they were never sent to restore since the chapter wanted to preserve them as artistic relics or decorative jewels, testimonies of the historical and religious trajectory of the cathedral.

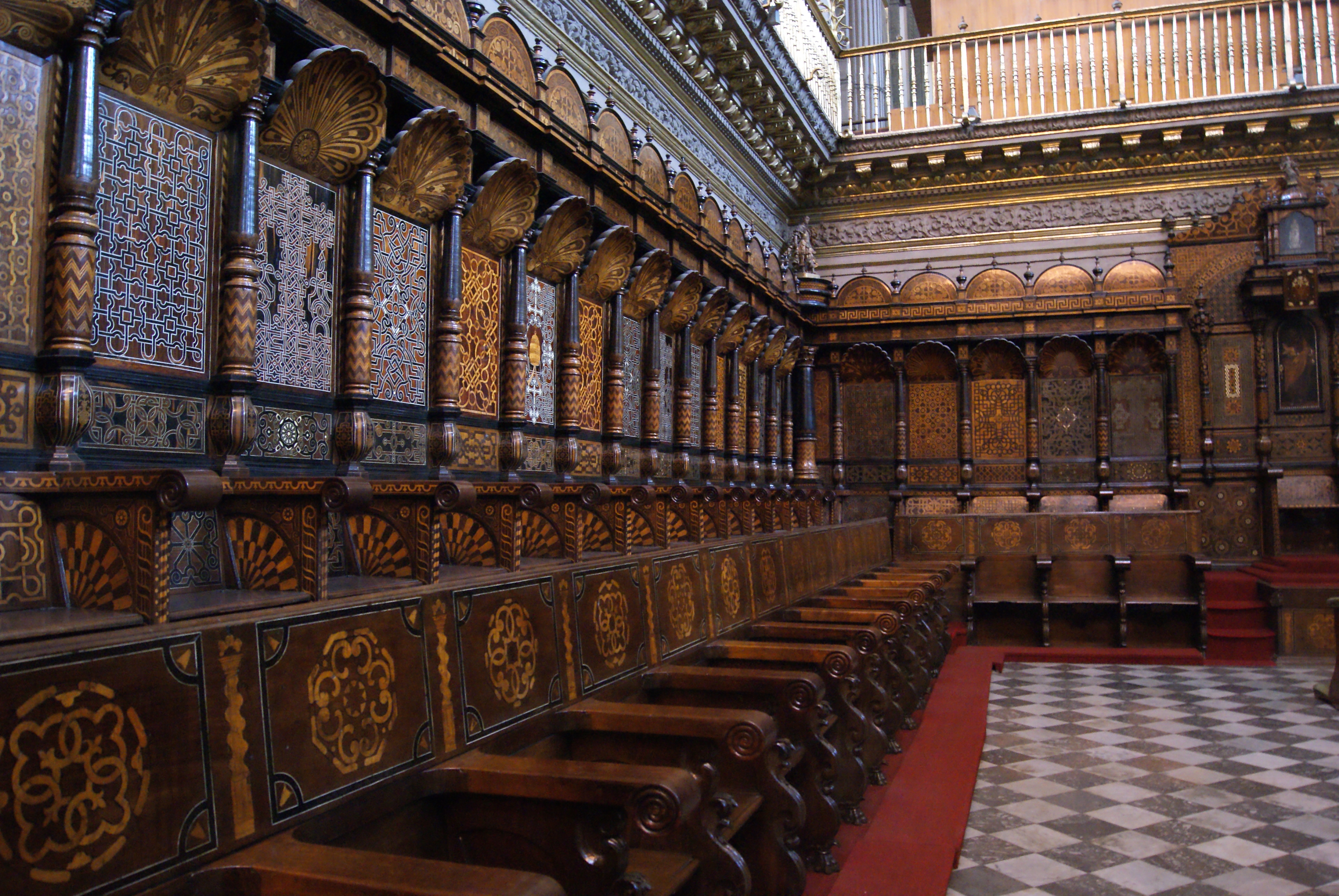
Choir stalls

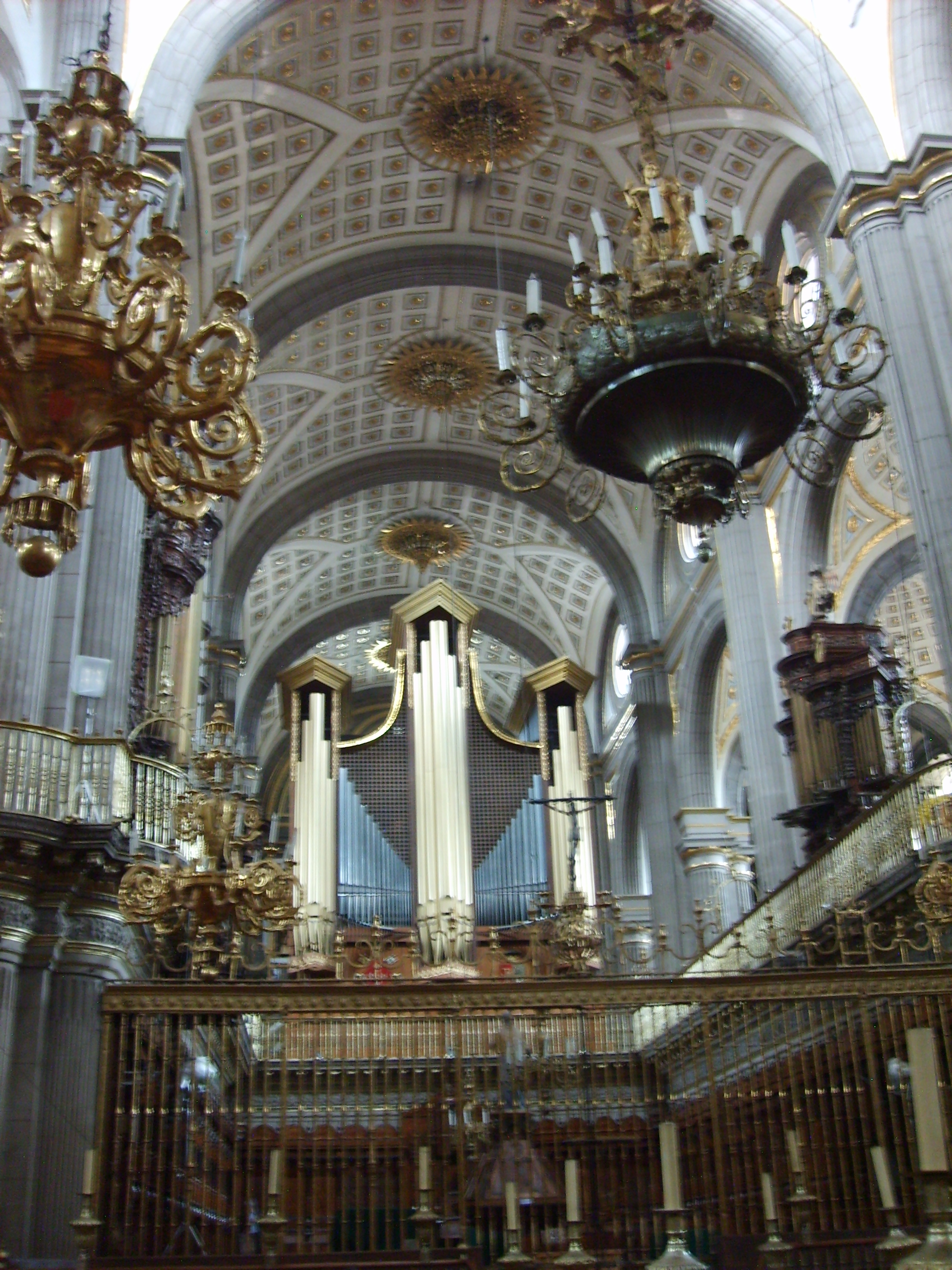
The Choir from the baldachin.

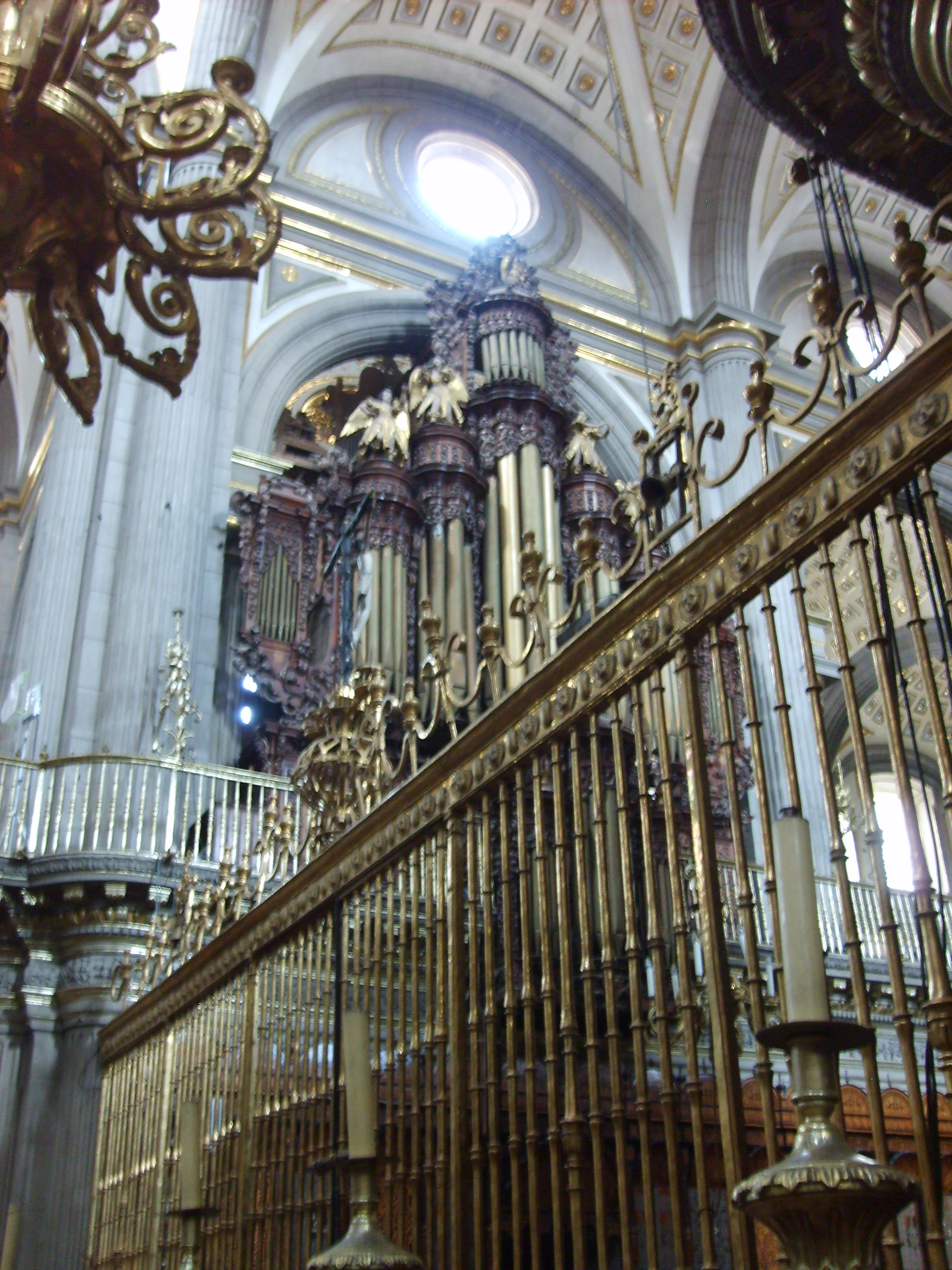
The organ and grille of the Choir.

=== Gospel chapels ===
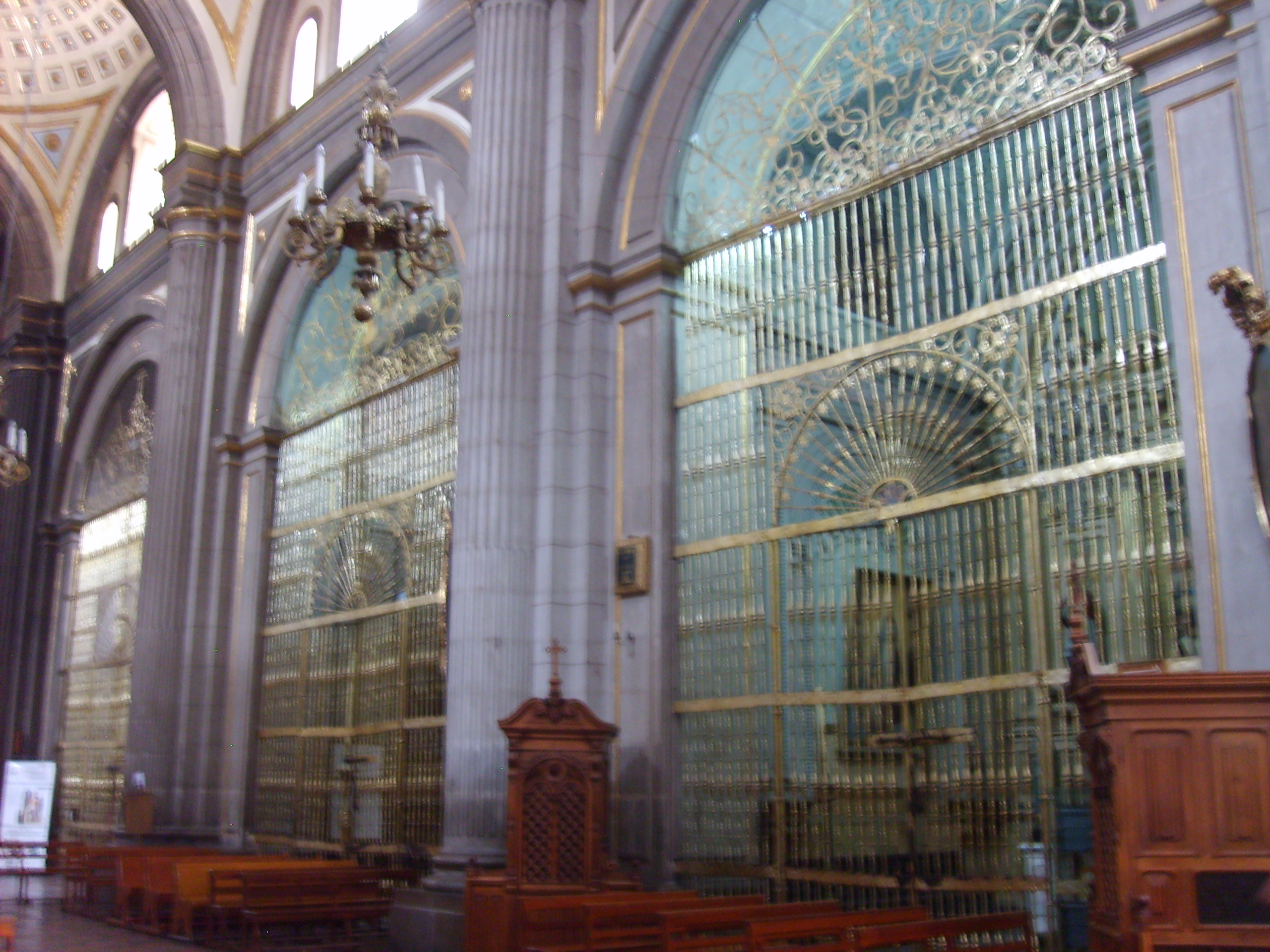
Chapels of the cathedral.

The left processional nave known as the Gospel nave has the following chapels:

- Chapel del Apóstol Santiago

This chapel communicates with the Sagrario (Tabernacle), the symbols on the fan of the grille indicate that it was originally consecrated to Saint James the Great, the Baroque altarpieces were removed to make way for a Doric Neoclassical one, which has a sculpture of Saint James the Less in the central niche, which must have come from the destroyed altarpieces. The painting of Saint Philomena stands out, patron saint of maids or lawyer to find honest servitude, it is the work of the 19th century artist Rafael Morante, in the other niches are John the Baptist and one of Saint Eligius of stupendous workmanship by the sculptor Zacarías Cora. The altarpiece of the gospel is by San José María Yermo y Parres and on the opposite side a gate that covered the old communication door with the Tabernacle, on this same side are: a descent and a Saint John of Nepomuk who offers the language that was cut as a tribute to the Virgin; work of Miguel Jerónimo Zendejas. The remains are found, under a large bronze tombstone, of the first constitutional governor of the state of Puebla Gral. José María Calderón.

- Chapel of San Pedro

The altarpiece inaugurated in the year 1830 is of a composite order with two columns, six pilasters and a niche where Saint Peter is placed and that of Saint Paul in another, the oil paintings of Jesus walking in the sea, Christ tied and Saint Francis of Assisi. works by Vincenzo Camuccini.

- Chapel of Our Lady of Guadalupe

José Manzo, who was in charge of transforming the Baroque decoration of some spaces of the cathedral into the Neoclassical style, placed the painting of the famous Oaxacan Miguel Cabrera of The Virgin of Guadalupe, already made in 1756 in her new altarpiece, accompanied by images of the Blessed Bartolomé Gutiérrez and Saint Philip of Jesus, martyred in Japan. On the side, the work of Cristóbal de Villalpando The Coronation of Mary and on the opposite side repeats Miguel Cabrera with the Holy Family, in front of the altarpiece of the Virgin, a cartouche says: (Non Fecit Taliter Omni Nationi), "He did not the same with all nations" phrase that Pope Benedict XIV said on la Guadalupana; On the floor are the mortuary remains of the first Archbishop of Puebla, Ramón Ibarra y González. The crossing continues after this chapel.

- Chapel del Sagrado Corazón de María

Originally it housed the relics of saints and other sacred objects, then it was dedicated to the apostle Saint Andrew, which is why his sculpture and his X-shaped cross, symbol of his martyrdom, are still preserved in the middle of the fence. Here again José Manzo intervened for the redecoration in the Neoclassical style by removing the Baroque altarpieces and thus consecrating it to (María Salus Infirmorum) "Mary health of the sick" whose painting was the work of the Pueblan master Francisco Morales Van den Eyden. The emphasis on the heart of the Virgin caused people to call it the "Sweet Heart of Mary". On the sides there is an Assumption of Mary painted by the Italian artist Vincenzo Camuccini and the anonymous paintings of Saint Alphonsus Liguori and Saint Bonaventure.

- Chapel of the Immaculate Conception

This chapel was entrusted to the Puebla silversmiths' guild, which had its respective ordinance, and the altarpiece consists of a statue of the Immaculate, Saint Louis of Toulouse, and Saint Bonaventure, on the side walls two oil paintings of Friar John Scotus Eriugena and the Pope Pius IX.

- Chapel del Señor de la Preciosa Sangre

The chapel "del Cristo", as it was formerly called because of the magnificent life-size sculpture of the crucified Jesus, which according to legend was said to have been made in Europe and blessed by Pope Paul VI, said without support, since the piece is made of corn cane paste, a raw material from the state of Michoacán, possibly brought by Bishop Antonio Ruíz de Morales y Molina, who ruled the diocese from 1572 to 1576, the sculpture is accompanied on the sides by a Virgin of Hope and a Saint John the Baptist, both by Master Lugardo. The three original Baroque-style altarpieces were removed by the architect José del Castillo to install Neoclassical ones in their place. There are also in small niches some heads carved in wood of Saint Peter and Saint Paul and a sculpture of "Christ the King of Mockery" anonymous painting and on the top of the grille a small "Divine Face".

- Chapel of San Nicolás de Bari

The space of this chapel was used as access to the stairs of the old tower and later a baptistery with a baptismal font. The Jesuits consecrated it to Saint Ignatius of Loyola in 1700, adorning it with three altarpieces and paintings, the work of Juan Rodríguez Juárez. At the beginning of the 20th century, by decision of the chapter, the cult of Saint Nicholas of Bari was moved to this chapel, which was in his chapel to one side of the high altar, so its numerous devotees interfered with the ceremonial of the Eucharist. In the same way as the other chapels, it was converted to the Neoclassical style; the sculpture of Saint Nicholas stands out, attributed to José Antonio Villegas Cora and the paintings on the genealogy of the Virgin Mary by the 17th century painter José Rubí de Marimón, the other paintings on the sides refer to the action of the Holy Bishop in the Council of Nicaea and the miracles that were performed in his tomb. This chapel is the last of the processional nave of the gospel.

=== Chapels of the Epistle ===
The following chapels correspond to the right processional nave known as the nave of the Epistle:

- Chapel of Our Lady of Sorrows

This chapel communicates with the sacristy, in the altarpiece is the representation of the Virgin of Sorrows and the Calvary and on the sides Saint Rose of Lima and Saint John Vianney.

- Chapel del Sagrado Corazón de Jesús

At the foot of this altarpiece is the image on canvas of a portrait of Our Lady of La Manga, an image that miraculously appeared on the cuff of a Mexican Hieronymite nun, as well as the remains of General Miguel Miramón and the journalist Trinidad Sánchez Santos.

- Chapel of the Holy Relics

Chapel of the Relics. The 9th bishop Juan de Palafox y Mendoza consecrated it to Saint Catherine of Alexandria, then to Saint Andrew and later to Saint Anne. At the end of the 17th century, the council decided that the relics be moved here, so that the celebrant could admire them from the high altar. It was again the architect José Manzo who transformed the chapel, like the one in front, equipping it with an altarpiece identical to that of la Guadalupana. Artists from the Academy of Fine Arts made the busts that contain in their interior fragments of the bones of male and female saints, whose lists are written down in the boxes on the fence. Inside the central niche, reliquaries of different shapes and materials are kept, along with paintings by Juan Tinoco. On the altar there is a copy of the Dolorosa de Acatzingo and under it is the Roman wax figure of Saint Florence martyr, with his relics inside. Among the relics are the femur of Beato Sebastián de Aparicio. In paintings you can see Saint Sebastian and Saint Ignatius of Loyola from the Sumaya brush by the Valencian Baltasar Echave, on the sides those of the adoration of the kings to the child Jesus, and the Presentation of Jesus at the Temple by the brush of José de Ibarra called in his time The Mexican Murillo of the 19th century. The crossing continues after this chapel.

- Chapel of San Juan Nepomuceno

Originally dedicated to Saint John the Evangelist, it was decided to consecrate it in 1678 to Saint Nicholas of Bari. The numerous and nourished devotion to the Saint disturbed the ceremonies of the high altar, which is why they changed their cult and devotion to the chapel on the west side of the gospel and dedicated it to Saint John of Nepomuk.

On the altar you can see a painting of the Virgin of la Luz, and a sculpture of Saint John of Nepomuk made by José Antonio Villegas Cora from the 18th century. On the sides Saint Francis of Assisi and Saint Francis of Paola sculpted by Bernardo Guerrero. The lateral walls are adorned with two paintings in each one with scenes of Saint John of Nepomuk.

- Chapel del Señor de la Columna

This statue of the Señor de los Azotes (Lord of the Whips) was brought from Acatzingo, Puebla, on the side walls are covered by two large chrome oil paintings signed by Cristóbal de Villalpando in the year 1683 The descent from the Cross and the Transfiguration of Jesus in the passage of the metal serpent of the desert.

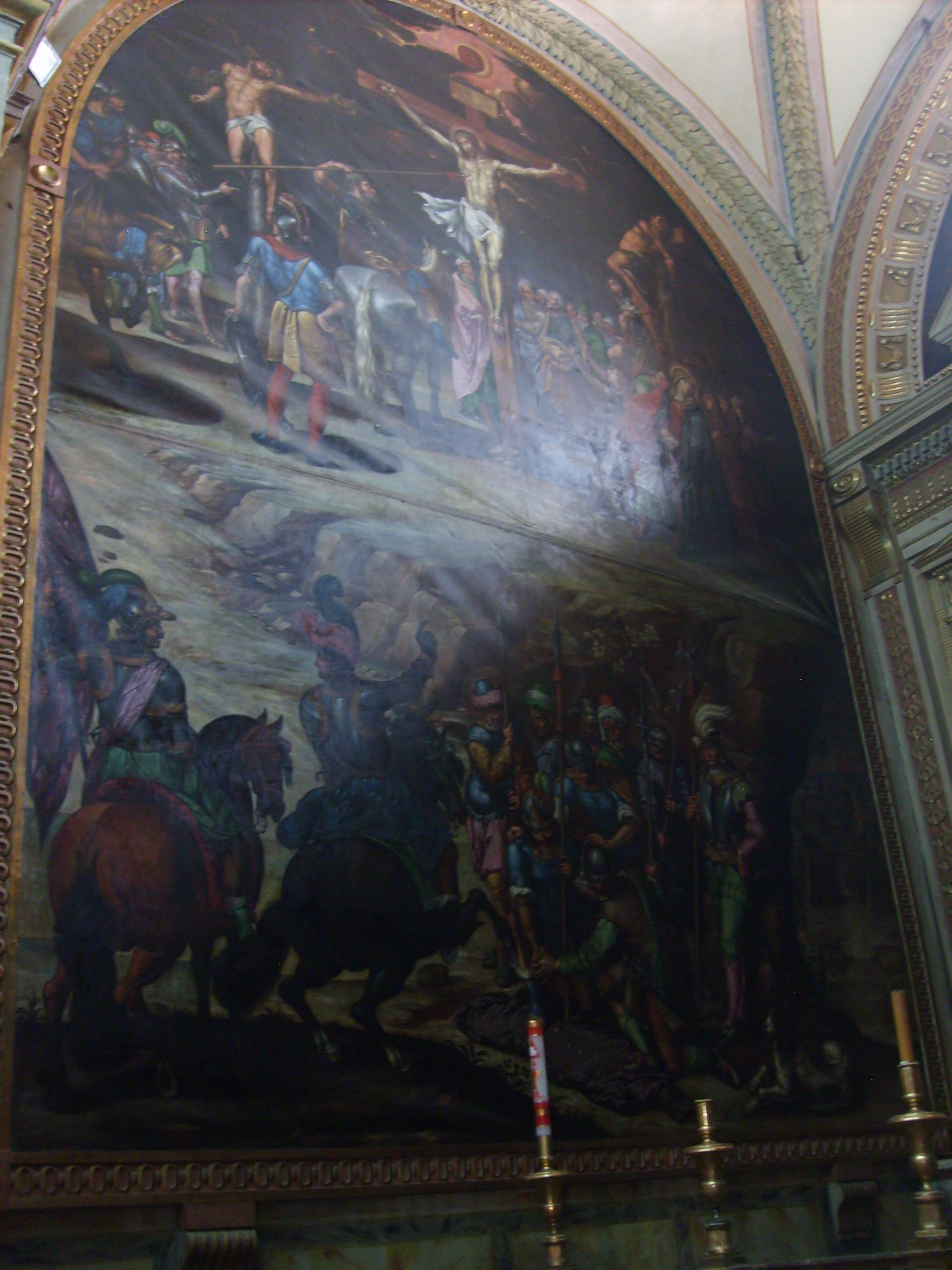
One of the two gigantic wall paintings on the sides of the Chapel of Nuestra Señora de la Soledad, attributed to Rodrigo de la Piedra.

- Chapel of la Sábana Santa

As in several chapels, José Manzo intervened in this one to transform it into the Neoclassical style, who also painted allegories to the Passion, Saint Aloysius Gonzaga and Saint Stanislaus Kostka, famous Marian Jesuits. The neo-Gothic bronze baldachin houses the image of the Virgin of Ocotlán, which is why many call this chapel in her name, the patron saint of Puebla and Tlaxcala. It is a replica of the original made by Bernardo Olivares Iriarte. Above the altar there is a magnificent "Catalan calvary".

Every Good Friday the canopy is crossed and the altarpiece is opened revealing the copy of the Holy Shroud, which is perhaps the oldest work in the cathedral, since it has the legend: "copied from the original of Turin, April 8, 1594" thus like a sign with capital letters: Extractu ab originali Taurini, it was brought to Mexico by Archdeacon Fernando Gutiérrez Pacheco. Accompanying the sides are two paintings, one of Saint Veronica and the other of the dead Christ, whose origin is unknown but they are presumed to have been made by Pedro García Ferrer, a relative of Palafox y Mendoza.

- Chapel of Nuestra Señora de la Soledad

The last chapel next to the door of this nave has a Neoclassical style altarpiece, the side murals are covered with two paintings of the Passion, from the 17th century, The Descent and The Calvary, there is controversy about their authorship, on the one hand it is attributes it to the Spanish artist Rodrigo de la Piedra and on the other to Antonio de Santander.

=== Sagrario (Sanctuary) ===
The Capilla del Sagrario Metropolitano of Puebla is a chapel of the cathedral, of the city of Puebla, Mexico. The chapel called del Sagrario responded to the need to have a space apart from the cathedral to deal with matters related to the Sacraments and spiritual services originally imparted to the Criollo-Spanish population and their servants, as it was also that the interior of the cathedral as an episcopal see should not, for practical reasons, serve as a parish.

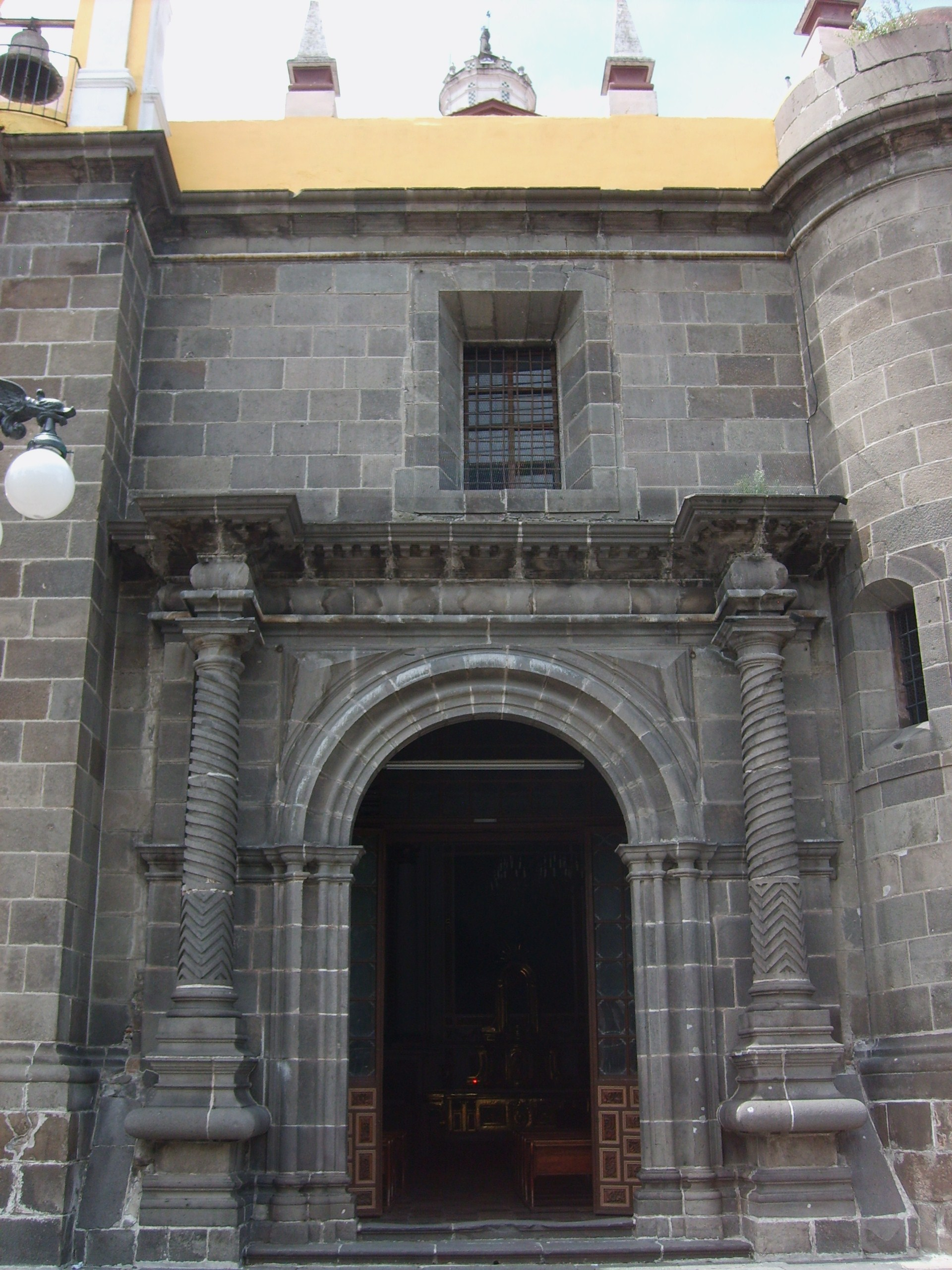
Access portal to the Capilla del Sagrario Metropolitano.

=== Sacristy ===
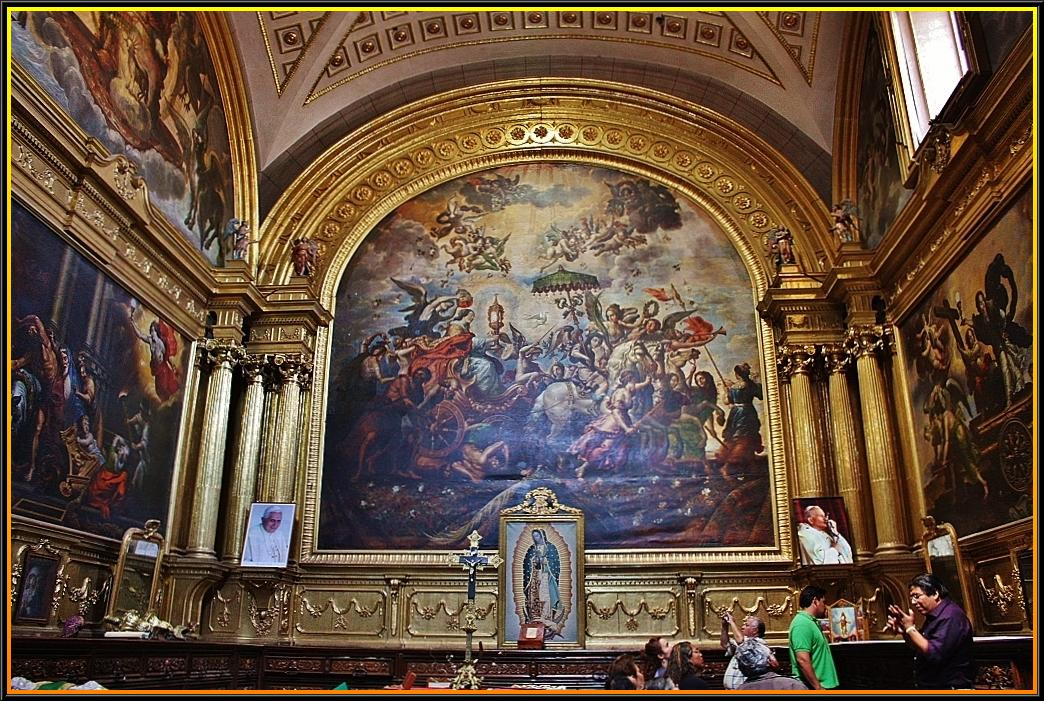
The "Triumph of the Catholic Church" by Baltasar de Echave in the Sacristy.

The access to the Sacristy is through the first chapel on the side of the epistle, its measurements are 17 m and 10.40 m wide.

The large space is surrounded by a large chest of drawers made of fine wood that houses the rich and abundant liturgical ornaments and in the middle a large table made of fine wood in the Renaissance style. The upper part of the sacristy is full of paintings. The large canvas in the background represents The Triumph of the Catholic Church over paganism, the lateral panels cover them, on the left, the painting of "The Triumph of the faith of Jesus Christ over the pagan theogony" and on the right another of the "Triumph of the religion", all by the 17th-century Mexican painter Baltasar de Echave Rioja that were copied from prints by Paul Rubens. Other canvases on the Revelations of the Apocalypse, also by Echave Rioja, crown the midpoints of the side panels. All these paintings are framed in gilt altarpieces of composite order of great aesthetic appeal.

The walls of the following vault are also covered with large-format canvases: In the front interspace, in a Churrigueresque-style painting, the "Immaculate Conception stands out under the patronage of the bishops of the Diocese of Puebla", beside it stands Friar Julián Garcés first bishop and Juan de Palafox y Mendoza to conclude the works of the cathedral, this beautiful canvas was painted by Luis Berrueco, and in the blades of its half point, the apparitions of Our Lady of Pilar to Saint James and Saint Ildefonsus.

On the sides is "The lavatory" of the painter Luis Berrueco from the 18th century. On the sides of the entrance doors are two ovals, one of Saint Joseph and the other of Archangel Michael, both by the painter Ibarra. In one corner of the large space is a 3 m high tecali marble fountain or ewer.

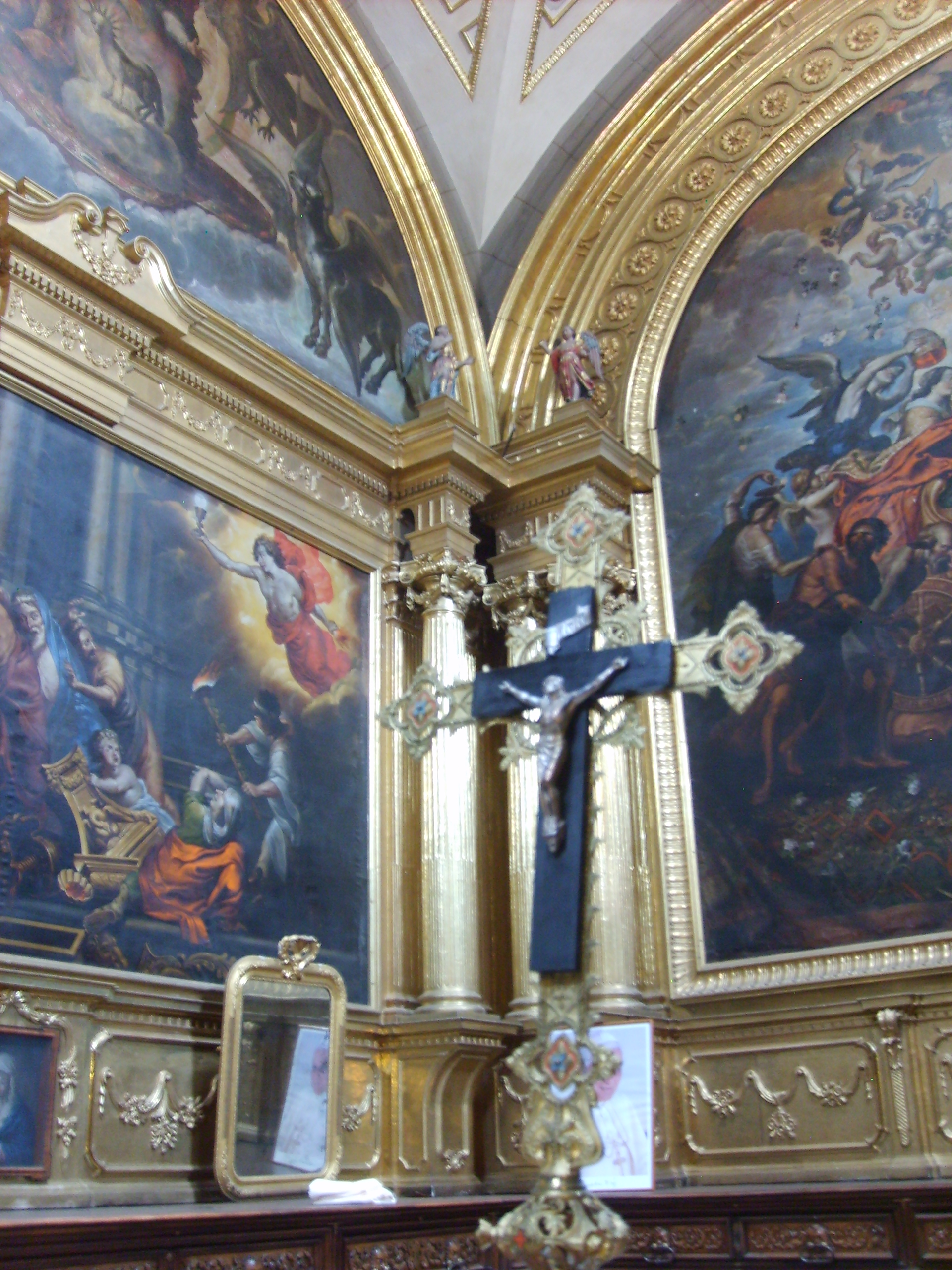

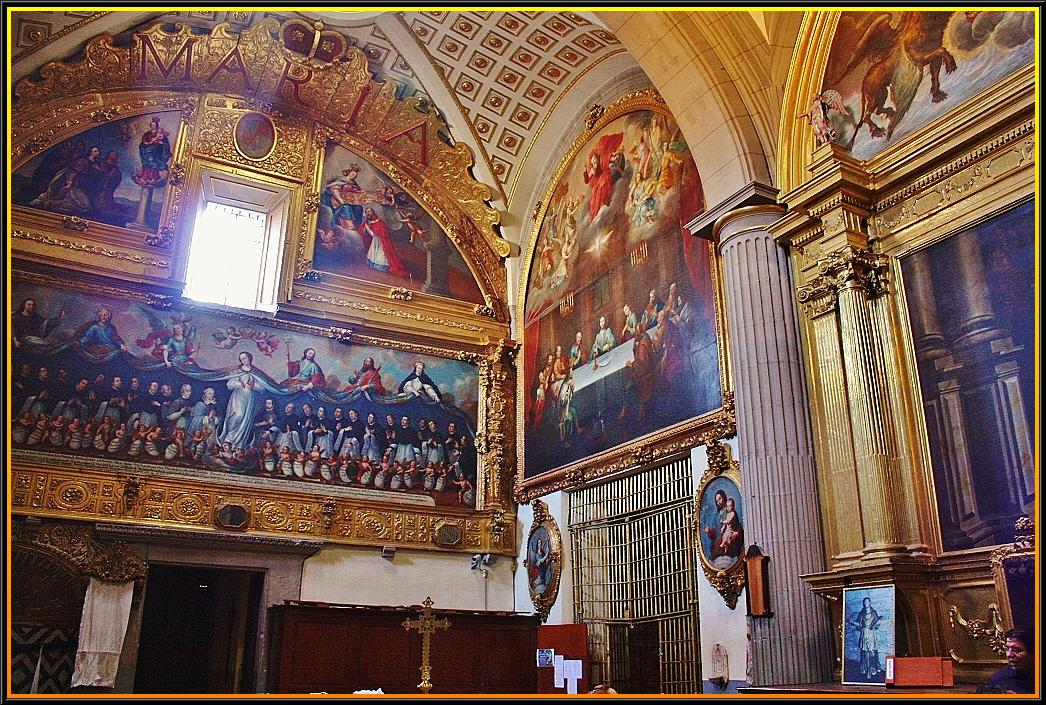

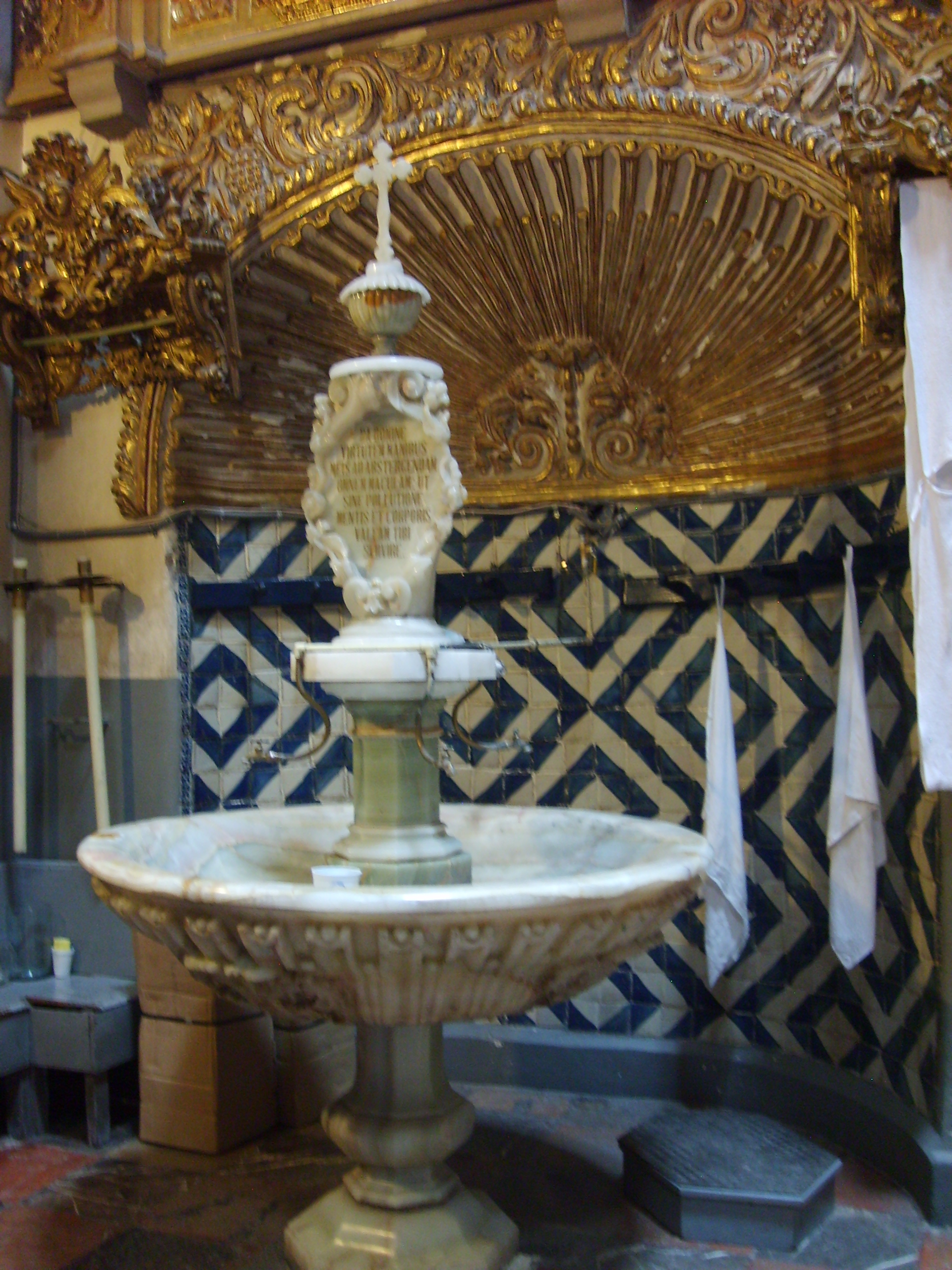

=== Hall of los Gobelinos ===
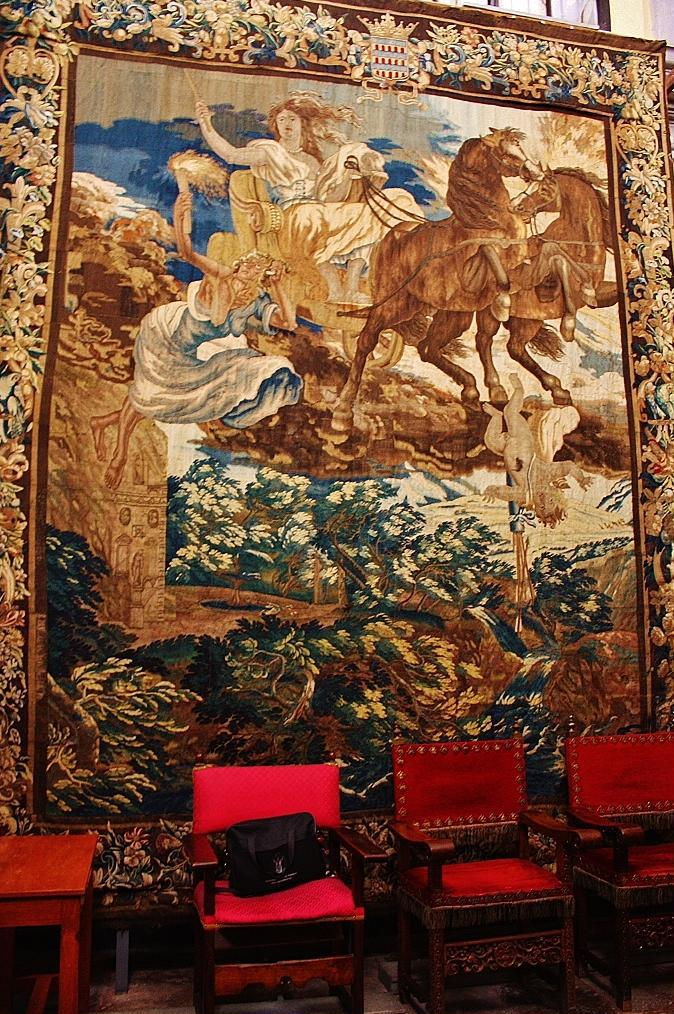
One of the four gobelins in the Hall of los Gobelinos.

In this room, 4 tapestries (Gobelins) from Greek mythology shine in all their magnificence, representing Queen Hippolyta of the Amazons on the banks of the Termodont who was defeated by Heracles, the chariot of the aurora excels as a nurse of nature and the encounter of Thalestris and Alexander the Great Generalissimo of the Hellenes. The last gobelin is the embarkation of the Argonauts in search of the golden belloniso, they come from the French manufacture of Jean Gobelin of the fifteenth century, brought by the Spaniards.

=== Chapter House ===
Also known as the Hall of Bishops, it was carved with a certain amount of stone, it was originally covered with “expensive moldings in the manner of those of Mexico, with ribs, an enclosure that was modified by groin vaults made of flagstone and brick. One of the areas less known by the public of the majestic Cathedral of Puebla, which only a few people access. In it are the portraits of the bishops that Puebla has had throughout its history, such as: Rosendo Huesca y Pacheco. In the center is a statue of Saint John Nepomuk, who is there to remember the secrecy of the meetings. It has changed places several times, firstly it is the twin room of the sacristy, which was later inhabited as the Sagrario, remaining, as it has been until today, separated from the main enclosure, even in matters of worship. Later, the room that is currently the Hall of los Gobelinos was built, with its dome for greater solemnity, and then, in the 19th century, the construction of the room that today serves for the aforementioned purposes. The current Chapter House has the Hall of los Gobelinos as an antechamber, although it is somewhat narrower since it measures just 5.07 m. wide by 20 m. of length. It is covered with groin vaults, barely pointed, one of them with a skylight, oculus or "porthole", in the front wall.

=== Chocolatier hall ===
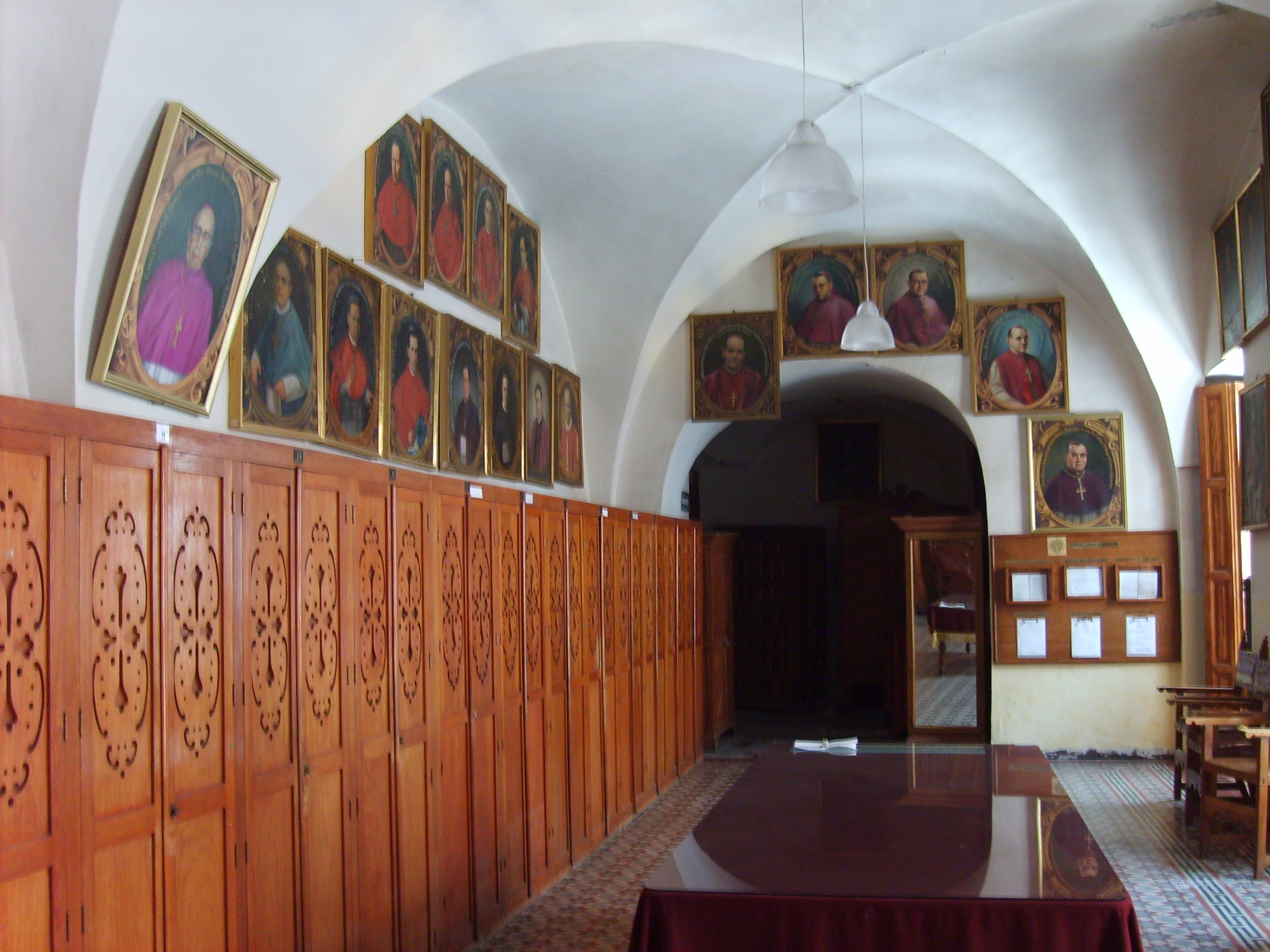
Chocolatier hall

The chocolate room is located next to the Hall of los Gobelinos and its windows adjoin the old Calle del Obispado (now 5 Oriente). It was used by the prebendaries and canons to store their belongings in the narrow cabinets that each one was assigned, it was also provided with breakfast or snack during the long sessions of chapter in which cups of chocolate were not lacking. Its vaults are edge or handkerchief divided into several sections. Along its three walls are the oil portraits of distinguished canons of the Puebla cathedral who would later attain episcopal dignity.

=== Archive ===
The physical Archive of the Cathedral Chapter is a space of 14 m by 4 m adjacent to the sidewalk of 5 Oriente with only access through the Chapter house, very small for the extensive amount of documents it keeps. It has documents dating back to 1539, such as volume number one of the branch "Actas de cabildo" and the "Asientos de diezmos arrendados" from the period 1539–1583, even before the third Mexican Council of 1585 ordered the establishment of archives for the New Spanish cathedrals. Since its formation as a repository of documents, it remained in the same place through the centuries without great order or concert, only until 1952 did the Cabildo resolve its ordering, but not its classification, since it did not have indexes or catalogues. Without due control and because it was considered a pile of old papers, the archive suffered the theft of documents, many times unconsciously and others self-interested, such as the fact that there is not a single signature of Bishop Palafox, an absence attributed to the fact that the older students advantaged of the Palafoxian Seminary was rewarded with an original signature of the prelate as a souvenir. In the same way it suffered other important mutilations such as the evident lack of complete files torn from volumes of lawsuits for tithes or for rights and prerogatives of the cathedral. With all this, the cathedral Chapter Archive is considered one of the most important of the New Spanish period and indispensable for regional history. The archive was rescued and organized by Support for the Development of Archives and Libraries of Mexico.

Among the most important branches of the archive, the following stand out:

- Acts of council from 1539 to 1558
- Briefs of certificates and trades, episcopal governments of Fabián y Fuero, López Gonzalo and Pérez de Echeverría
- Chaplains
- Cédulas Reales from 1540 to 1796.
- Confraternities.
- Correspondence of Bishop Francisco Pablo Vászquez y Sánchez Vizcayno.
- Council Decrees.
- Tithes from 1539 to 1856.
- Edicts and pastoral letters.
- Building of the churches from 1570 to 1829.
- Cathedral inventories.
- Books of payments to the Holy Inquisition.
- Music: series containing 145 files, 86 choral books and 21 minor books.
- Music by Juan Gutiérrez de Padilla: seven sets of Christmas carols belonging to the years 1551, 1552, 1553, 1555, 1556 and 1557 for eight voices, in addition to the one from 1559 for seven voices.
- Palafox y Mendoza: about 50 volumes of his printed works.
- Poor and widows.
- Graves.
- Manuscripts of an indeterminate number of authors: Eguiranta, Palafox, Clavijero, Alegre, among many other branches.

==== Music ====
The cathedral in Puebla had a distinguished musical tradition, dating from the late sixteenth century. One of the most distinguished musicians was Juan Gutiérrez de Padilla, active as chapel master from 1629 to 1664. His wrote extended and complex works, including polychoral masses as well as villancicos (for the Christmas season). His music shows between others the evidence of New Spain's non-white population in tocotines (Nahua influence) and negrillos and porto ricos (African influence). The cathedral has extant choir books of his compositions. His villancicos "stand as one of the greatest contributions to American music history."

=== Chapel del Espíritu Santo (Ochavo) ===
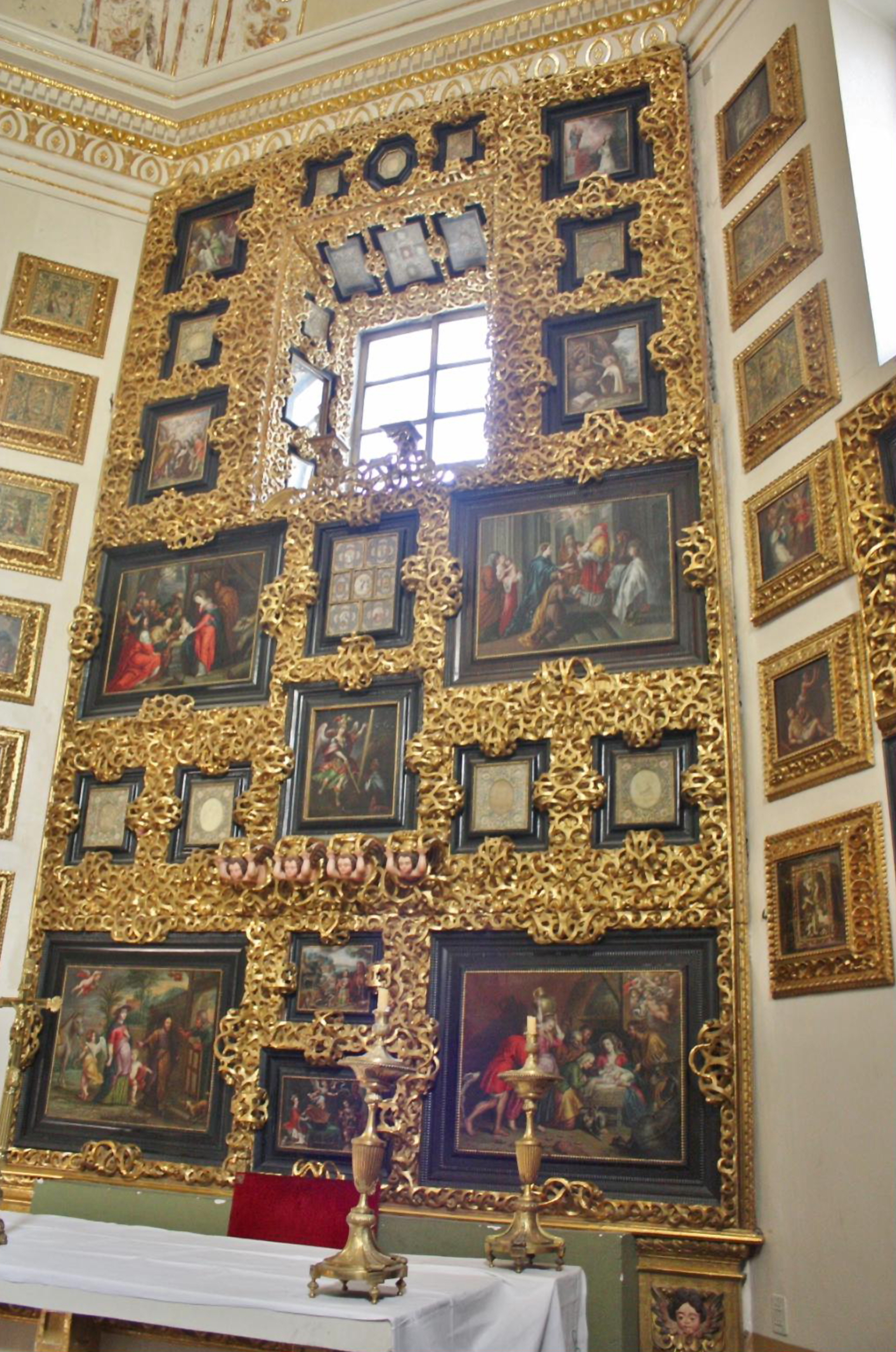
Altarpiece inside the Chapel del Ochavo

This chapel is better known as del Ochavo, it has a semicircular vault and an 8-sided lantern, its interior is covered by 3 altarpieces that are covered with small paintings and mirrors belonging mostly to historical religious series. This chapel is in the Baroque style of the 17th century, it was a small oratory and deposit, today reduced to its minimum expression and disuse, the oil paintings alternate with framed and embroidered reliquaries, they are works by Cristóbal de Villalpando. It was built under the episcopal government of Manuel Fernández de Santa Cruz.

Its factory is due to the renowned architect Carlos García Durango commissioned by a chapter session who approved the work in the year 1674. It was designed on an octagonal floor plan then called Ochavada enclosed in a box of almost 10 m per side with walls of 7.30 m high to the base of the dome which is covered with bricks and finished off with a lantern with Talavera decorations ending in an iron weathervane.

=== Jewelry ===
The cypress is decorated with 48 candlesticks or bouncers, silver with gold overlays, one meter high of exquisite workmanship, with their respective candles, and 8 silver bouncers with gold overlays, 4 beautiful burnished silver jugs with their bouquets silver cupella 1.80 m high are combined with the said bouncers and in the tabernacle four other equal jars with their bouquets although 1.20 m high, 25 oil lamps and 6 lamps hang from the vaults of the church, of which two stand out that hang on the sides of the tabernacle of more than 2 m high and 30 lights each. One of the beautiful lamps that hang from the largest dome, the second in size, is a masterpiece by the goldsmith Diego Larios, it was premiered on Corpus Christi in 1751, it is a work they call Mestiza because it is made of silver with gold overlays, he maintains 42 lights. It has other sets of candlesticks and lecterns, being one of exquisite workmanship, bronze candlesticks with their sets of pedestals, paxes, scepters, 6 rods for the pallium, salvillas, pitchforks, gold thuribles among other things.

The monstrance that serves the day of Corpus and circular jubilee, is made of gold, almost a meter high with a multitude of diamonds and emeralds on each side, it was released on June 1, 1727. There is another gold one of about a meter high, it is made of gold of various shades and is mounted with pearls, emeralds, diamonds, topazes, amethysts and garnets, it was premiered in September 1803, the work of Antonio de Villafañe. Francisco Javier Clavijero in his Description of the City of Puebla de los Ángeles speaks of some of these pieces:

The silverware of this cathedral church is superb, among other things it has a large silver lamp a little smaller than that of the Cathedral of Mexico but superior to it due to the excellence of the work with which it is made. It has 4 silver statues the height of a man. It stands out above all for its wealth, the monstrance [...] of solid gold adorned with precious stones, among which there is a diamond valued, it is said, at 10,000 escudos.

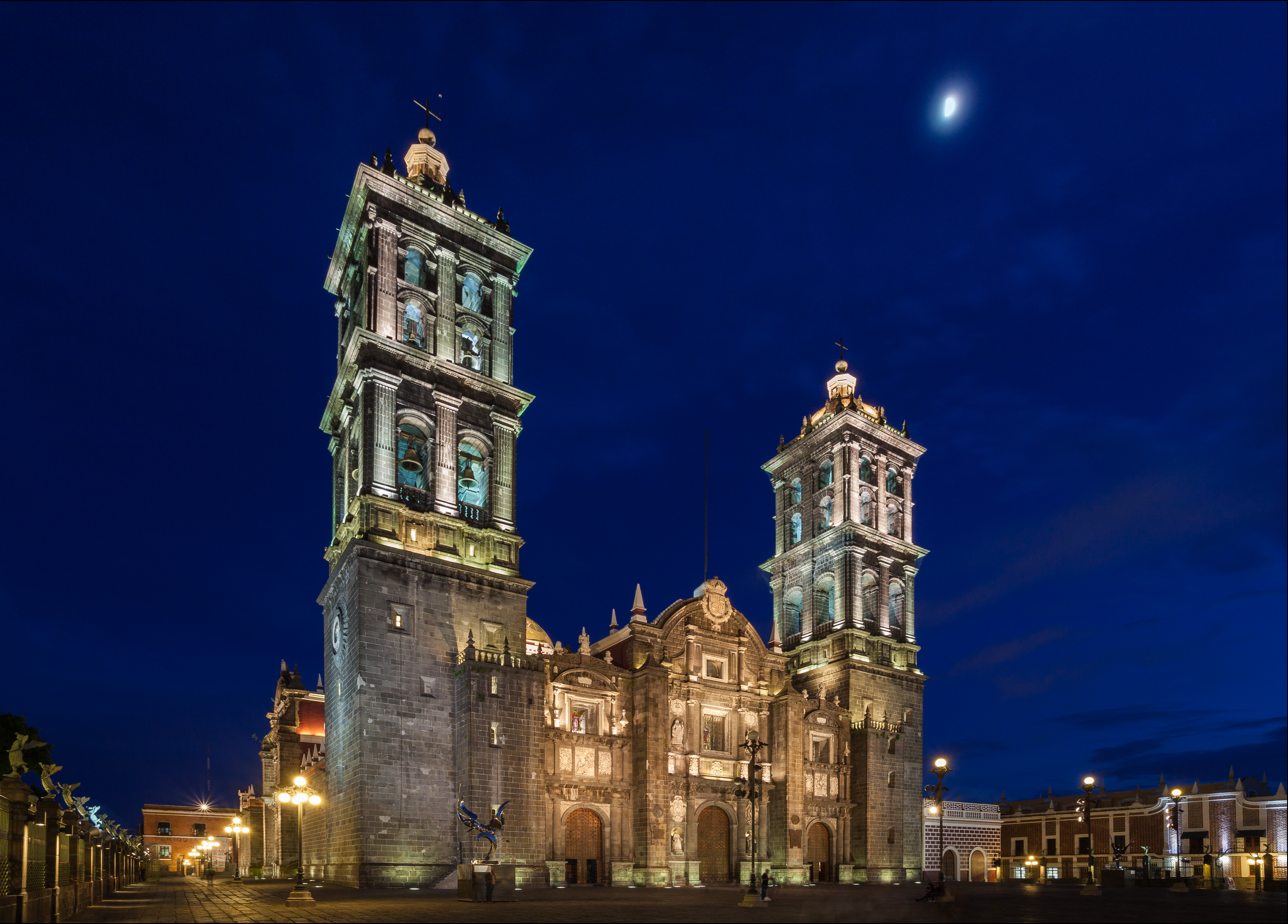
Puebla Cathedral illuminated at night

Among the sacred vessels, two gold ones stand out, as well as a monstrance, made by José Inzunza. An elegant tenebrio of 5 and a half meters high in ebony wood richly adorned with silver, the work of José Mariano Castillo.

== Schedules ==
In the cathedral basilica, five daily masses are celebrated from Monday to Saturday, while on Sundays there is a great deal of activity, with up to ten masses being celebrated. The schedules are subject to changes or variations depending on the patron saint festivities, Easter, Christmas, or depending on the saints.

Mass schedule
Sundays
7 a.m., 8 a.m., 9 a.m., 10 a.m., 11 a.m., 12 p.m., 1 p.m., 6 p.m., 7 p.m. and 8 p.m.
Monday to Saturday
7 a.m., 8 a.m., 9 a.m., 9.45 a.m., and 7 p.m. (On Mondays, at 12:00 p.m., the mass is celebrated in honor of Saint Nicholas of Bari.)

== See also ==
- List of buildings in Puebla City
- Atrial cross
