= Juan de Palafox y Mendoza =

Spanish politician, administrator and Catholic clergyman (1600–1659)

Blessed Juan de Palafox y Mendoza
- Bishop of Puebla de los Ángeles and Osma
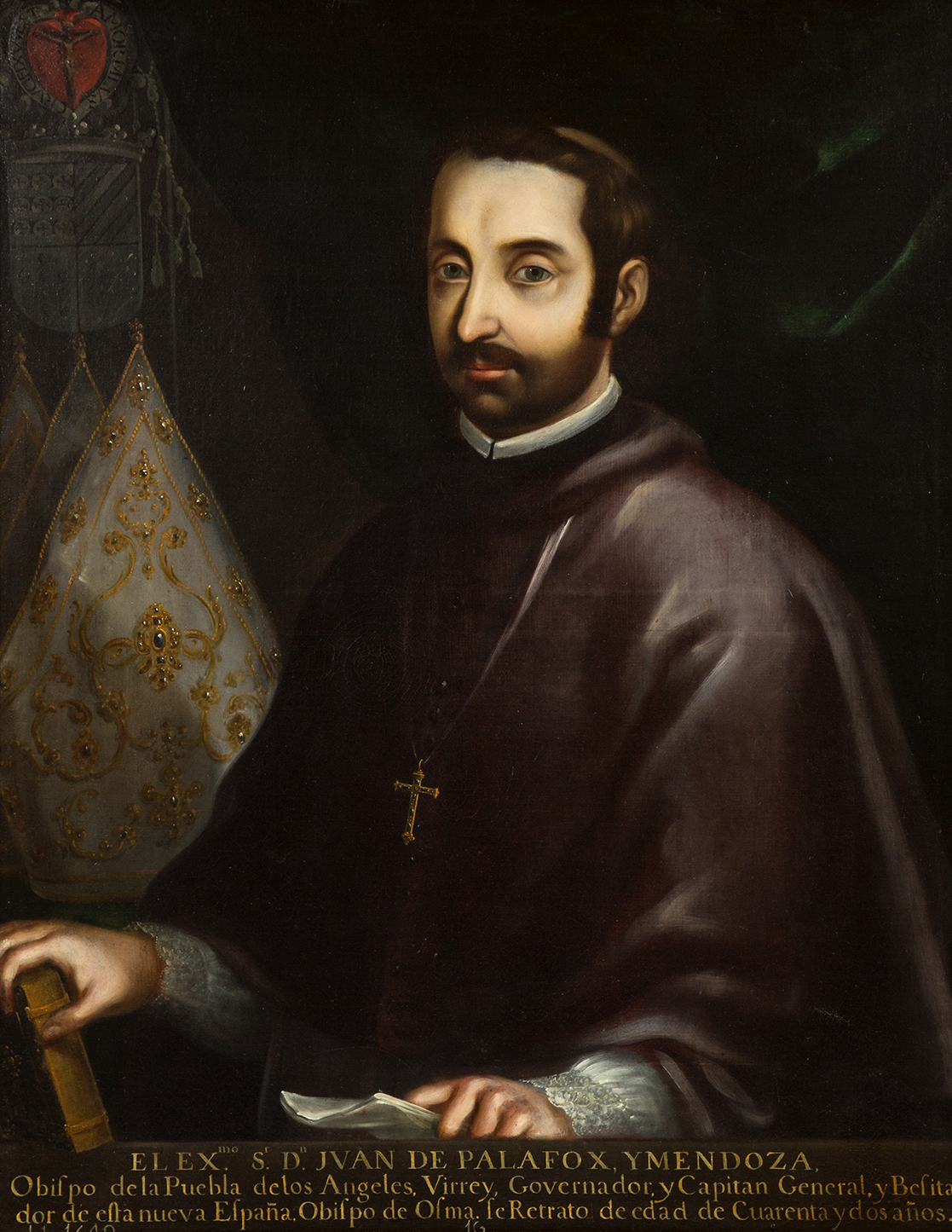
- Blessed Juan de Palafox
- Church: Roman Catholic Church
- Archdiocese: Osma
- Appointed: 16 August 1653
- Term ended: 1 October 1659
- Predecessor: Antonio Valdés Herrera
- Successor: Nicolás Martinez, O.S.H.
- Other post: Bishop of Puebla de los Ángeles (1639–1653)

Orders
- Ordination: April 1629 by Francisco Hurtado de Mendoza y Ribera
- Consecration: 27 December 1639 by Cardinal Agustín de Spínola Basadone
- Rank: Bishop

Personal details
- Born: Juan de Palafox y Mendoza; 24 June 1600 Fitero, Navarre, Spain
- Died: 1 October 1659 (aged 59) Osma, Soria, Spain
- Buried: Cathedral of the Assumption of Our Lady in Burgo de Osma, El Burgo de Osma, Soria, Spain

Sainthood
- Feast day: 1 October
- Venerated in: Roman Catholic Church
- Title as Saint: Blessed
- Beatified: 5 June 2011; Cathedral of the Assumption of Our Lady in Burgo de Osma, El Burgo de Osma, Soria, Spain by Cardinal Angelo Amato, S.D.B.

18th Viceroy of New Spain
- In office 10 June 1642 – 23 November 1642
- Monarch: Philip IV
- Preceded by: Diego Roque López Pacheco Cabrera y Bobadilla
- Succeeded by: Diego García Sarmiento de Sotomayor

Juan de Palafox y Mendoza (26 June 1600 – 1 October 1659) was a Spanish politician, administrator, and Catholic clergyman in 17th century Spain and a viceroy of Mexico.

Palafox was the Bishop of Puebla (1640−1655), and the interim Archbishop of Mexico (1640−1642). He also held political office, from 10 June 1642 to 23 November 1642 as the Viceroy of New Spain. He lost a high-profile struggle with the Jesuits in New Spain, resulting in a recall to Spain, to the Diocese of Osma in Old Castile. Although a case was opened for his beatification shortly after he died in 1659, he was not designated "Blessed" until 2011.

== Early life ==
Born in Navarre, Spain, Don Juan Palafox y Mendoza was the natural son of Jaime de Palafox, the Marquis of Ariaza, of the Aragonese nobility. His mother became a Carmelite nun. He was taken in by a family of millers who gave him the name "Juan" and raised him for ten years, after which his father recognized him, and had him educated at Alcalá and Salamanca.

In 1626 he was a deputy of the nobility in the Cortes de Monzón, and later a prosecutor at the Council of War and a member of the Council of the Indies, the chief administrative body for administration of the overseas territories of the Spanish Empire.

== Ecclesiastical career ==
Palafox was ordained in 1629, and became the chaplain and almoner of Maria of Austria, Holy Roman Empress, the sister of King Philip IV of Spain. He accompanied her on her various trips around Europe.

In 1639 based on Philip IV's nomination, Pope Urban VIII appointed him, Bishop of Puebla de los Ángeles and "visitador general" of Mexico. Puebla de los Ángeles was the second largest city in the Viceroyalty of New Spain (viceroyal México) then, and is the present day City of Puebla. He was consecrated Bishop in Madrid on 27 December 1639.

He left for America and arrived in Veracruz on 24 June 1640. He was in the company of the new Viceroy of New Spain, Diego López Pacheco, 7th Duke of Escalona, whom he had gotten to know during the voyage. That same ship brought an Irishman, William Lamport, known in New Spain as Don Guillén de Lombardo y Guzmán, who played a role in political turmoil during the 1640s. Palafox was also named Visitador (royal inspector, representative of the king), to investigate the two previous viceroys. His retinue further included the Aragonese painter Pedro García Ferrer and the Flemish painter Diego de Borgraf.

He served as Bishop of Puebla from 1640 to 1655, and as interim archbishop of Mexico from May 1642 to 1643.

=== Jesuits controversy and recall ===
He was embroiled in a major controversy with the Jesuits over ecclesiastical jurisdiction that eventually cost him his post as Bishop of Puebla de los Ángeles. The Spanish crown was moving to displace mendicant orders from their populous and lucrative doctrinas in central Mexico, and replace them with parishes staffed by secular (diocesan) clergy with benefices rather than mendicants. He was largely successful in doing so in Puebla.

He then targeted the Jesuits as another entity that did not respect ecclesiastical jurisdiction by paying tithes, essentially a 10% tax on agricultural production, to the Church hierarchy. In the 1640s when he took on the Jesuits, Palafox pointed out that the Jesuit order was a hugely wealthy landowner in New Spain. Jesuits claimed that the income from their haciendas went exclusively toward support of their educational institutions (colegios) and their missionary work on the colonial frontiers. On principle, Palafox asserted that it was the spiritual duty of all to pay the tithe, which the Jesuits steadfastly refused to do. The tithe transferred wealth from the countryside's landed estates to cities and towns, supporting the cathedral chapter, parish priests, and charitable institutions.

Obviously, as a powerful bishop, Palafox would have been interested in increasing the revenue from Jesuit tithes, but also in asserting episcopal authority over that order. In 1647, the diocese of Puebla ordered all Jesuits to produce licenses from the diocese to preach and hear confession, something that was required under canon law and empowered bishops. The Jesuits asserted they needed no such licenses, that they could exercise such powers without special permission of a bishop. Palafox wrote that if this were true, that the bishop had no power in his own diocese and he would be separated from his own flock by "an alien authority".

The Jesuits found an ally against Palafox in the new viceroy, García Sarmiento de Sotomayor, 2nd Count of Salvatierra. Salvatierra sought to arrest Palafox. In 1647, rather than be arrested, which might have produced an uprising in Puebla against the viceroy's abuse of authority, Palafox fled to the mountains outside the city. The move was calculated to show the crown that the situation in New Spain was grave, that the viceroy and the Jesuits were challenging the rightful place of episcopal authority. In that he failed and was ultimately humiliated by being recalled to Spain.

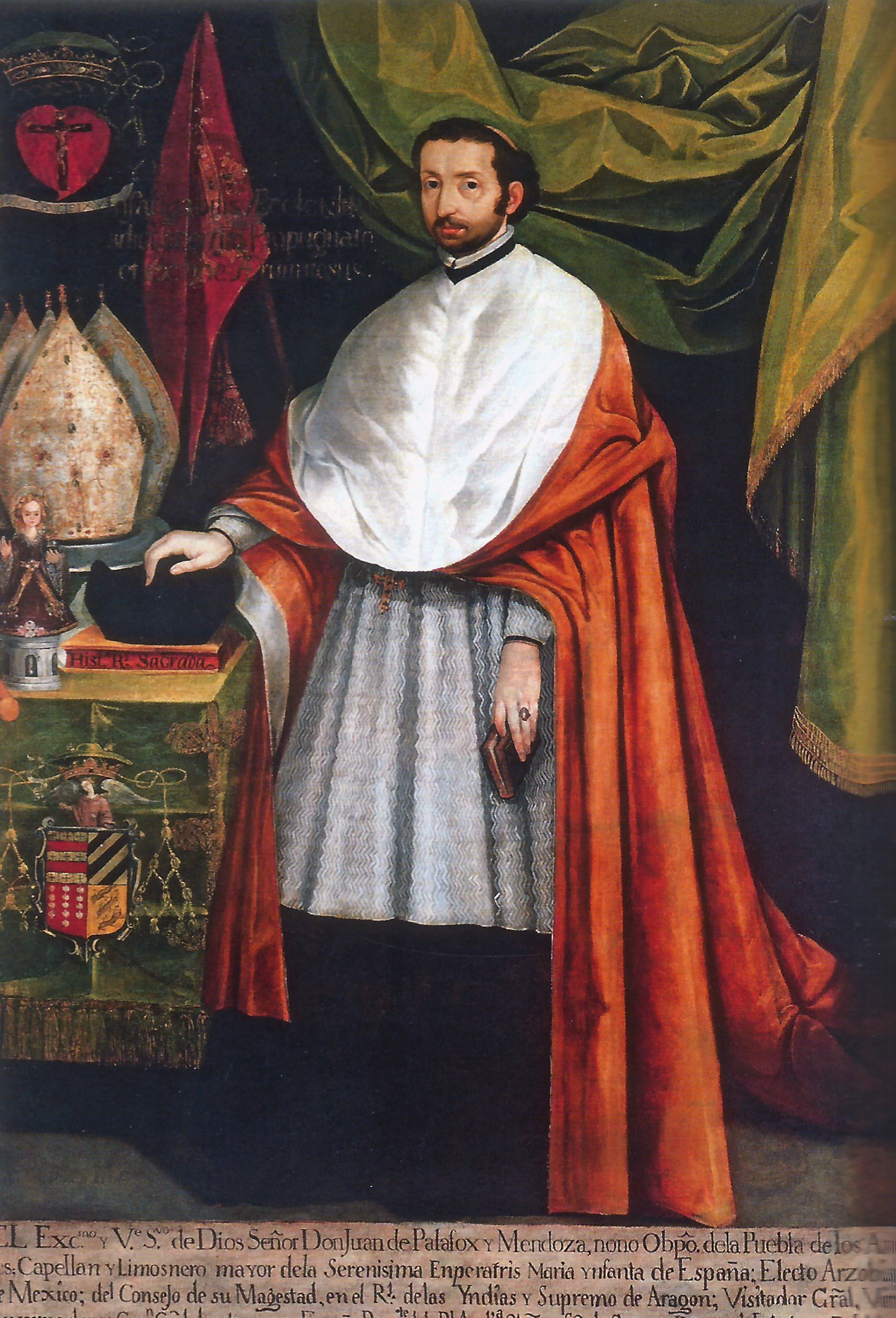
Portrait of Juan de Palafox y Mendoza, by Diego de Borgraf, 1643

Palafox laid formal complaints against the Jesuits at Rome. The pope, however, refused to approve his censures, and all he could obtain was a brief from Pope Innocent X (on 14 May 1648), commanding the Jesuits to respect the episcopal jurisdiction. On 20 May 1655, Palafox and the Jesuits signed an accord, but disagreements continued. In the same year the Jesuits succeeded in securing his transfer to the see of Osma in Old Castile. Although Palafox's ecclesiastical career went into eclipse, his writings against the Jesuits were subsequently published in France and in the eighteenth century, his writings were used to strengthen the case for regalist authority resulting in the expulsion of the Jesuits from Spain and Spanish territories in 1767.

Some of Palafox's influential anti-Jesuit writings deal with the Chinese Rites controversy. Palafox had jurisdiction as a bishop on certain Asian missions, but - according to Costa Rican scholar Ricardo Martínez Esquivel - the main reason he declared the Jesuit's tolerance for traditional ancestor worship practices among Chinese converts to Christianity as heretic was "his personal conflict" with the Jesuits.

=== Viceregal legacy ===
Palafox founded the Biblioteca Palafoxiana, the first public library in the Americas, on 5 September 1646, donating his own collection of 5,000 books to the College of San Juan to start the collection. It was the first public library in the Americas. He also founded the Dominican Convent of Santa Inés, the Colleges of San Pedro and San Pablo, and the girls school Purísima Concepción. He amended the by-laws of the seminary of San Juan. When Palafox arrived in Puebla he carried with him a real cédula dated January 19, 1640 that ordered the long-delayed completion of the cathedral. To finance the resumed construction, Palafox increased the tithes, which exacerbated his poor relations with the Jesuits. The cathedral was dedicated 18 April 1649.

As bishop, Palafox y Mendoza distinguished himself by his efforts to protect the Native Americans, forbidding any methods of conversion other than persuasion. Despite being well disposed toward the indigenous, he showed no interest in their history, which others of that era used to bolster notions of a long and distinguished history that predated the Spanish conquest, nor did he attribute anything spiritually special about the New World.

While bishop, Palafox was the principal consecrator of Francisco Diego Díaz de Quintanilla y de Hevía y Valdés (1640), Bishop of Durango; Fernando Montero Espinosa (1640), Bishop of Nueva Segovia; Diego de Guevara y Estrada (1642), Archbishop of Santo Domingo; Marcos de Torres y Rueda (1645), Bishop of Yucatán; Juan de Mañozca y Zamora (1645), Archbishop of México; and Diego López de la Vega (1650), Bishop of Badajoz.

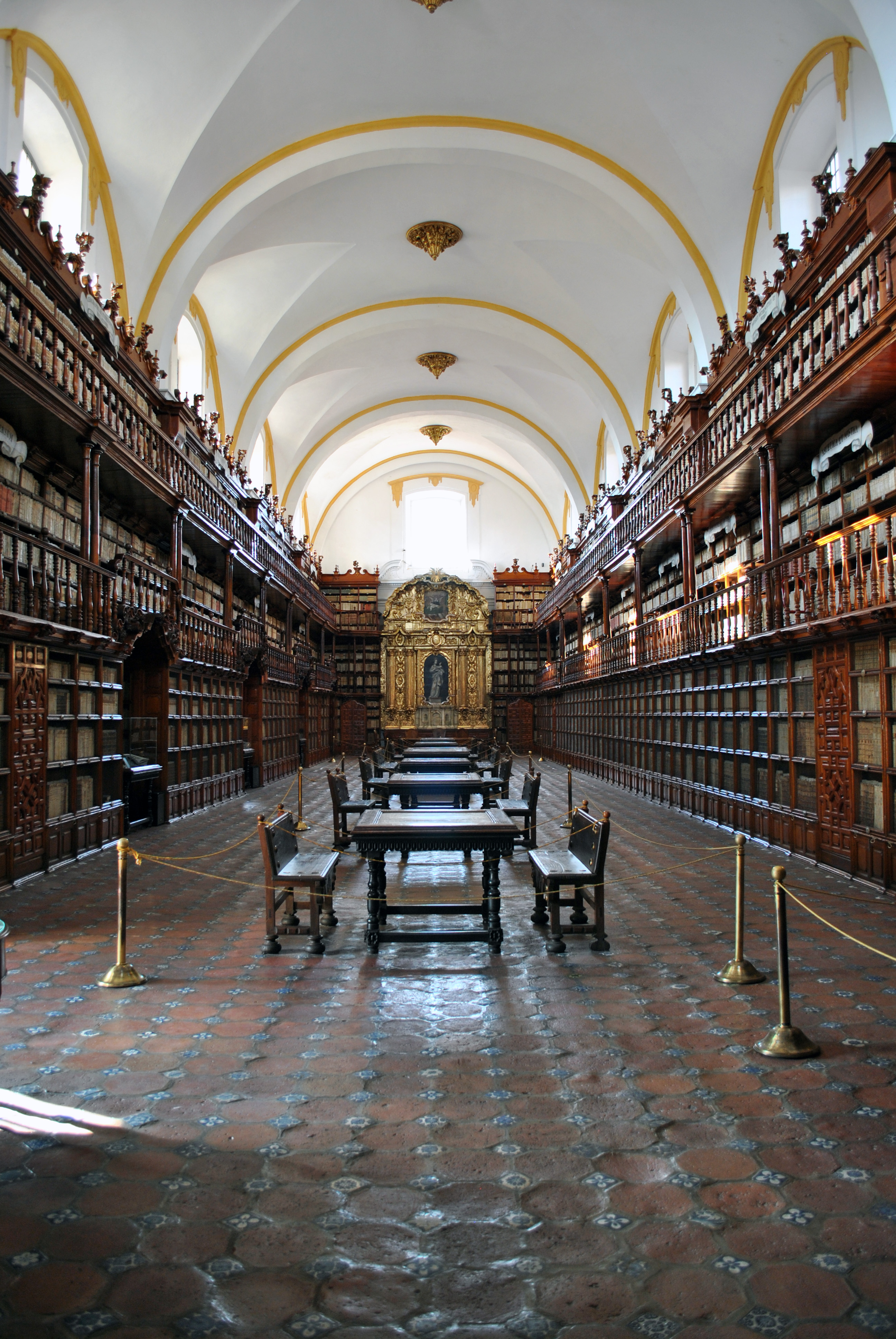
The Biblioteca Palafoxiana, in Puebla, Puebla

Palafox was an enthusiastic patron of the arts, and it was during his tenure in Puebla that the city became the musical center of New Spain. Composers such as Juan Gutierrez de Padilla, maestro di capilla of the cathedral under Palafox and the most famous seventeenth century composer in Mexico, brought the latest European music styles to the New World. Palafox also strongly believed in education in general.

== Political career ==
As visitador general, Bishop Palafox had powers to inspect practices in the viceroyalty, but the viceroy himself was protected from the inspector-general's inquiries, thus undermining his ability to pursue effective reform. Palafox's general mission was "to increase efficiency in government, strengthen royal authority, maximize the extraction of resources, and improve the administration of the viceroyalty", especially toward increasing the revenues for the crown. Blocked from effective reform, Palafox broke with Viceroy Diego López Pacheco Cabrera y Bobadilla in 1642, accusing the viceroy of being in league with Portugal, then at war with Spain to restore its independence following the Iberian Union; the viceroy was a cousin of the Duke of Braganza, since acclaimed king as John IV of Portugal. One scholar has characterized the suspicion of the viceroy's conspiring with rebels as being based on "slender evidence". Bishop Palafox claimed to have orders from the Crown, although he did not show them. He arrived secretly in the capital, and in the middle of the night of 9/10 June, he met with the Audiencia (high court) and laid out his suspicions. He then ordered that the viceregal palace be surrounded by guards. The following morning Viceroy López Pacheco was informed that he was under arrest and that the bishop had been named archbishop of Mexico and viceroy of New Spain. His possessions were confiscated and he was held for some time before being allowed to return to Spain. In Spain he was acquitted of the charges against him.

During his brief term as viceroy, Palafox established the laws governing the University, the Audiencia, and the legal profession. Palafox considered a key duty of the viceroy was to serve as president of the Audiencia, the high court, the seat of justice. Palafox wrote that the viceroy as president of the Audiencia should prudently treat the judges (oidores) with the greatest respect, but also "preserve the authority and superiority of the head" i.e., the president/viceroy. Two members of the Audiencia rejected his reforms, and he suspended them from office. Palafox also raised twelve companies of militia to protect the colony against the spread of revolution from Portugal and Catalonia, which was in revolt against the Spanish monarchy. He destroyed the pagan religious statues of the Indians that had been kept in the capital as trophies of the Spanish conquest.

He was succeeded as viceroy by García Sarmiento de Sotomayor, 2nd Count of Salvatierra on 23 November 1642, but continued to hold the post of visitador. Having a bishop serve as viceroy was not the usual pattern of appointment, but the extraordinary circumstances that prompted to crown to precipitously remove the previous viceroy meant that Palafox was a useful, if temporary, replacement until the crown appointed his successor. The high tension between the new viceroy, Salvatierra, and bishop and visitador general Palafox was not unprecedented however. In 1624 the viceroy the marquis of Gelves had ordered the expulsion of the archbishop from the viceroyalty, in clear terms the civil authority challenging the ecclesiastical. That earlier conflict had resulted in a huge riot in the main plaza of Mexico City and the ouster of the viceroy himself. The conflict between Salvatierra and Palafox, who was then acting as visitador, flared over what might seem a trivial matter, whether or not the viceroy could sit on a cushion when seated with the Audiencia. Palafox said no, since it distinguished the viceroy from the high court judges. However, the practice had been standard with earlier viceroys. Where the performance of power and its prerogatives was important not as minor traditions but as the theater of power, such a conflict was seated in deeper issues.

== Writings ==
Following the example of an earlier Spanish ecclesiastic in Mexico, Juan González de Mendoza, Juan de Palafox y Mendoza authored a book on China. His Historia de la conquista de la China por el Tartaro (History of the Conquest of China by the Tartars) reported on the conquest of the Ming China by the Manchus, based on reports that reached Mexico by the way of the Philippines. The work was first published in Spanish in Paris in 1670; a French translation appeared the same year. An English translation, whose full title was The History of the Conquest of China by the Tartars together with an Account of Several Remarkable things, Concerning the Religion, Manners, and Customs of Both Nation's, but especially the Latter, appeared in London in 1676. Palafox's work, based on hearsay, was generally less informed than De bello tartarico, an eyewitness account by the Chinese-speaking Jesuit Martino Martini.

His writings were published in 15 volumes in Madrid in 1762.

Recently a bi-lingual edition of his observations on Mexican Indians has been published under the title Virtues of the Indian/Virtudes del Indio.

== Cause of beatification and canonization ==
In 1694 Charles II of Spain petitioned for his canonization. The decree allowing the introduction of the cause of beatification was approved by Pope Benedict XIII in 1726, granting Palafox the title of Servant of God. In 1758, under Pope Benedict XIV, the procedure for the approval of Palafox's writings was initiated. The process was continued under the Pontificates of Clement XIII and Clement XIV.

However, though the process passed through the preliminary stages, securing for Palafox the title of Servant of God, the cause was in effect blocked under Pope Pius VI through the intervention of the Jesuits. A vote by the Congregation then responsible for the cause was taken on 28 January 1777 and twenty-six out of forty one prelates favored the continuation of Palafox's cause of beatification with the proclamation of a decree of heroic virtue; the decree was then submitted to Pope Pius VI for approbation; Pius VI, however, decided to suspend the final decision.

The cause thus was suspended in 1777 and remained so until 2003, when it was restored under Pope John Paul II; the question of the heroic virtue was returned to the consideration of the Congregation for the Causes of Saints. On 17 January 2009, Pope Benedict XVI approved the decree of the said Congregation recognizing Palafox's heroic virtue, thus granting him the title of Venerable. On 8 January 2010, the Congregation of the Causes of Saints accepted a miracle attributed to Palafox's intercession. The decree recognizing the miracle was promulgated by Pope Benedict XVI on 27 March 2010. The cause for his beatification was supported by the Diocese of Osma-Soria in Spain, where he spent the last years of his life and ecclesiastical career, following his unsuccessful struggle with the Jesuits in his Diocese of Puebla in New Spain (Mexico).

As the long process for holy recognition of Palafox by the Vatican, stretching from the late seventeenth century to the early twenty-first, it is clear that there were authorities opposed to his cause. The cause for his beatification likely found favor with John Paul II and his successor Benedict XVI. Both popes strongly advocated for the episcopal authority of the Catholic Church against secular authority, the position that Palafox advocated when he served in Mexico. Popes have considerable authority to delay or fast track causes for beatification and canonization. While Pope John Paul II often announced beatifications during papal visits, Benedict XVI discontinued the practice of going to the announced beatifications in person in the home locale. The ceremony for the beatification of Palafox was overseen by the Papal Legate, Cardinal Angelo Amato, Prefect of the Congregation for the Causes of Saints.

Juan de Palafox was finally proclaimed Blessed on 5 June 2011. The rite of beatification was presided over by Cardinal Angelo Amato, Prefect of the Congregation for the Causes of the Saints, by mandate of Pope Benedict XVI. Palafox's feast day is 6 October.

== Notes ==
Catholic Church titles
Preceded by Antonio Valdés Herrera	Bishop of Osma-Soria; 1641 – 1653	Succeeded by Nicolás Martínez, O.S.H.
Preceded by Gutiérrez Bernardo de Quirós	Bishop of Puebla; 1639 – 1641	Succeeded by Diego Osorio de Escobar y Llamas
Political offices
Preceded by Diego Roque López; Pacheco Cabrera y Bobadilla	Viceroy of New Spain; 1642	Succeeded by Diego García Sarmiento de Sotomayor
