= Diego de Borgraf =

Flemish painter

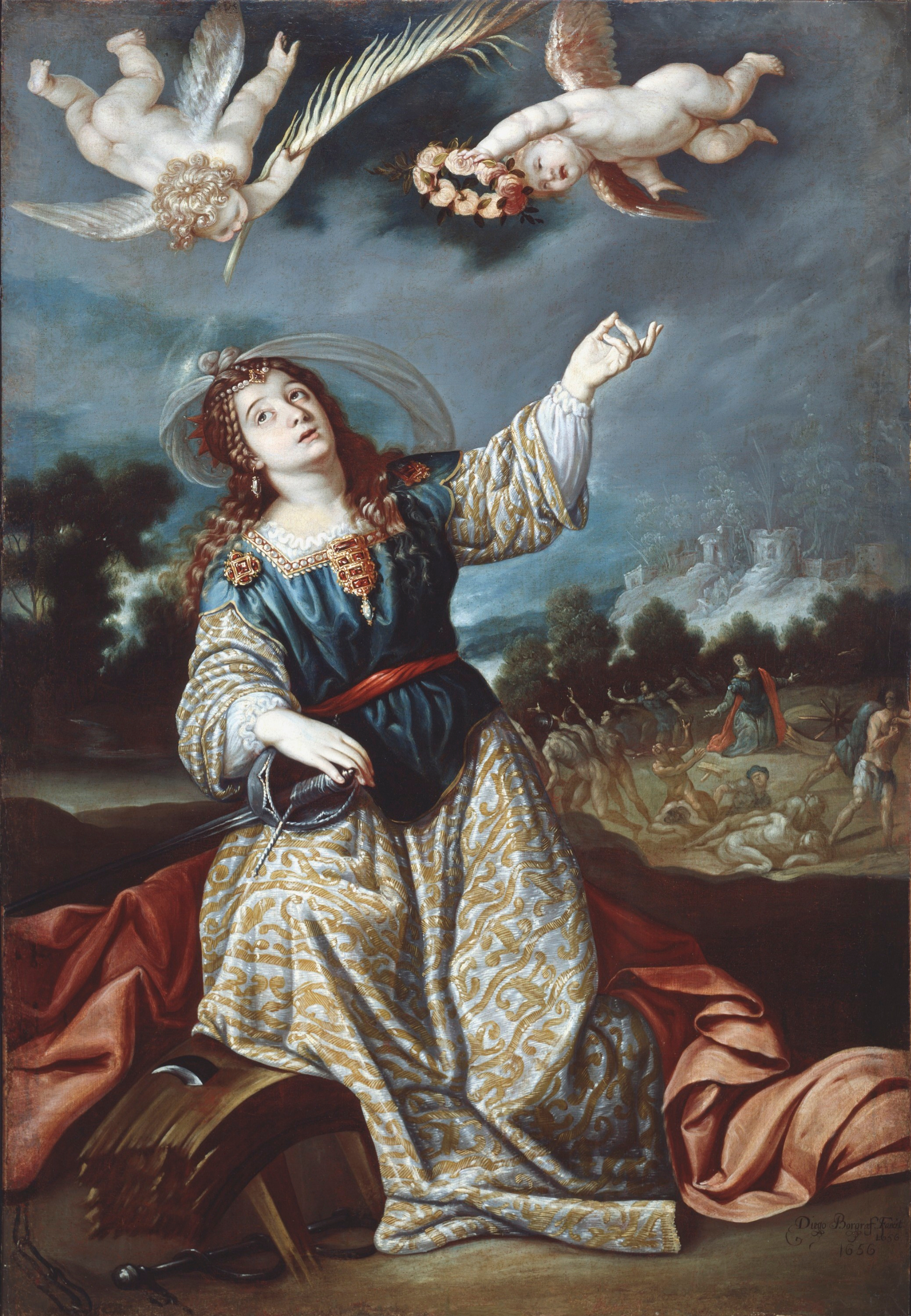
Saint Catherine of Alexandria

Diego de Borgraf or Diego Borgraf (November 1618 in Antwerp – 4 March 1686 in Puebla) was a Flemish painter, who, after training in Flanders and working at the court in Madrid, moved permanently to Puebla in Mexico. Here he became one of the leading colonial painters, creating paintings of biblical scenes and figures, saints and portraits.

== Life ==
Very little information is known about de Borgraf's early life and training in Flanders. At the time of de Borgraf's birth in Antwerp in 1618, Flanders was a part of the dominions of the crown of Spain. He was the son of Lodewijk Borchgraeve and Joanna Ruebens.

Because of the Mannerist characteristics of his style is believed to have trained with the painter Hendrick de Clerck, a court painter in Brussels. This would mean he would have worked in Brussels and possibly established a relationship with the court. This may explain how he subsequently travelled to Spain where he resided for several years. He left for America, accompanying Bishop Juan de Palafox y Mendoza in 1640. The Aragonese painter Pedro García Ferrer (1583–1660) was another artist who accompanied the Bishop. He must have been the principal artist in the Bishop's retinue since de Borgraf was much younger. It is possible, although not documented, that de Borgraf initially worked in the workshop of García Ferrer. This would explain why his name is only first mentioned 8 years after his arrival in America when he was one of the artists working on the altar screens for the cathedral of Puebla.

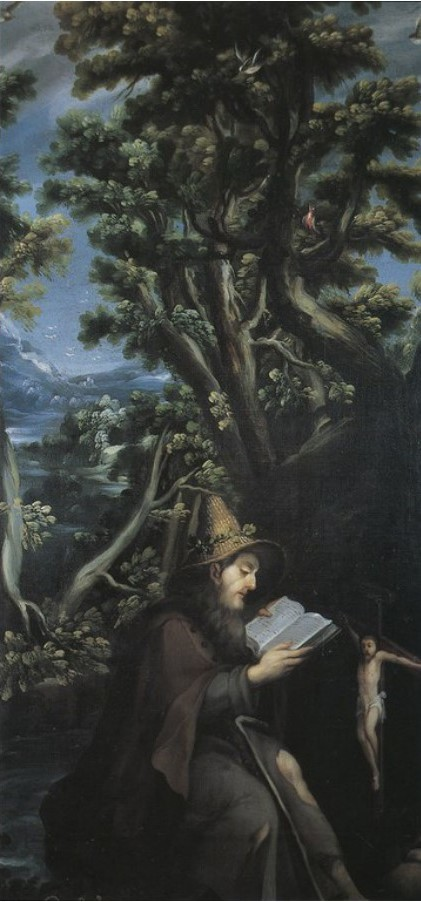
St. Judas Cyriacus

As long as Palafox and García Ferrer remained in Mexico, de Borgraf was not able to secure commissions on the scale of those undertaken by García Ferrer. However, when the latter returned with the bishop to Spain in 1649, de Borgraf became one of the leading artists in Puebla, where he was recorded from around 1649.

He operated in Puebla a workshop in which Diego and Antonio de Espinoza and José Márquez were his apprentices. He married three times. His first wife was María de Gasetas, with whom he had no children. The second time he married Francisca Rodríguez de Paredes, by whom he had children, who all died. He married a final time on 29 September 1671 to Ana Jiménez. Their marriage remained childless. He died in March 1686, and was buried on the 10th of the same month in the church of San Agustín.

== Work ==
He painted biblical scenes and figures, saints and portraits. None of his pre-American works are known. Many of his works can still be found in religious institutions in Tlaxcala and Puebla. From 1652 dates a Christ Tied to the Column in the sacristy of the parish church of Cholula, a Saint Francis, in the church of La Concordia in Puebla, and the Death of Saint Francis Xavier in the church of Analco. There is a Saint Francis Appears to Saint Teresa dated 1677, in the sacristy of the Temple of St. Francis of Assisi, the current cathedral of Tlaxcala. His style is dry but with a precise drawing style. His output showed quality but was often mixed.

De Borgraf may be considered one of the founders of the Puebla painting tradition, which was different from the style of the capital Mexico, due to the direct influence of European painting in Puebla. The chronology of his work is not well understood. He originally painted in a tenebrist style but later moved to a more colorist approach. While the influence of Flemish painting is obvious in the detailed treatment of materials, his work generally shows a more important influence by Spanish painters such as Velazquez.

He worked on a commission for the order of the Brothers Hospitallers of the convent of Our Lady of Bethlehem in Puebla. For this commission, he produced, together with his workshop, a series of 13 paintings of Hermit Saints of Puebla. The works illustrate the biographies of religious figures, have a vertical format and are no more than 1.5 m high and 80 cm. wide. They are executed in a Flemish style. The compositional model for these works was derived from a number of engravings after designs by the 16th-century Flemish painter Maerten de Vos.
