= Luis Enríquez de Guzmán, 9th Count of Alba de Liste =

Mexican politician

Don Luis Enríquez de Guzmán Marquis of Villaflor Count of Alba de Liste
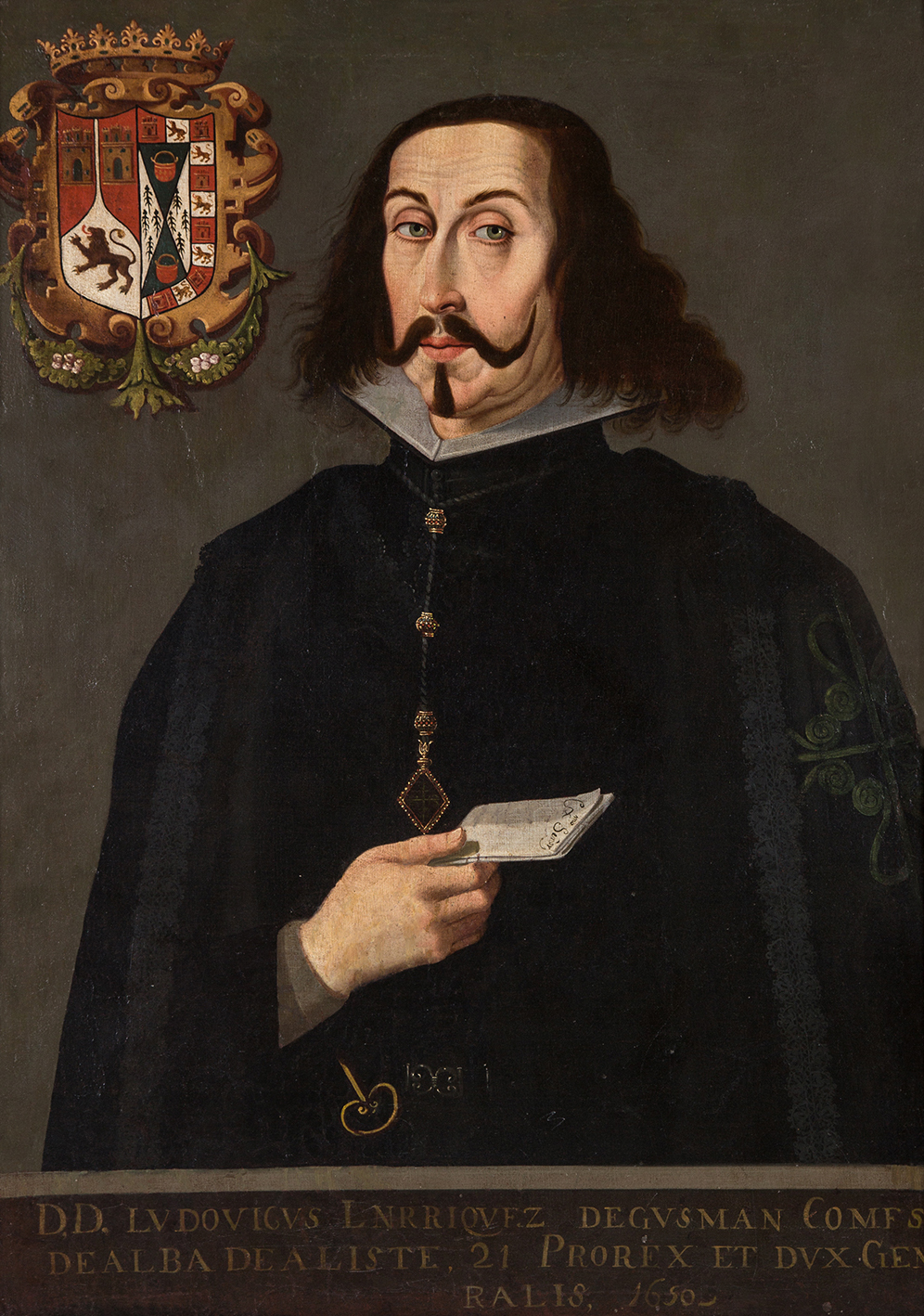

17th Viceroy of Peru
- In office February 24, 1655 – December 31, 1661
- Monarch: Philip IV of Spain
- Valido: Luis de Haro
- Preceded by: García Sarmiento de Sotomayor
- Succeeded by: Diego de Benavides

21st Viceroy of New Spain
- In office June 28, 1650 – August 15, 1653
- Monarch: Philip IV of Spain
- Valido: Luis de Haro
- Preceded by: Marcos de Torres y Rueda
- Succeeded by: Francisco Fernández de la Cueva

Personal details
- Born: c. 1600 Habsburg Spain
- Died: March 12, 1667 (aged 66–67) Habsburg Spain

Don Luis Enríquez de Guzmán, 9th Count of Alba de Liste (Spanish: Don Luis Enríquez de Guzmán, marqués de Villaflor y noveno conde de Alba de Liste; also sometimes, Luis Henríquez de Guzmán, conde de Alba de Aliste) (c. 1600 – March 12, 1667) was viceroy of New Spain from June 28, 1650 to August 14, 1653 and thereafter viceroy of Peru, from February 24, 1655 to December 31, 1661).

== In Spain ==
Don Luis Enríquez de Guzmán was the ninth conde de Alba de Liste. He was a lieutenant and police officer in Zamora and mayor of Sacas. He also held other posts in government service, and was made a Knight Commander in the Order of Calatrava.

== In New Spain ==
He was named viceroy of New Spain on May 28, 1648, under King Philip IV of Spain. He arrived in Chapultepec, near Mexico City, on June 27, 1650, and the following day received his office from the Audiencia. Nevertheless, his actual government didn't begin until July 3, when he made his official entrance into Mexico City.

His main accomplishment as viceroy was to reform the colony's treasury. He took the collection of tributes and sales taxes from the royal officials and established instead two tribunals to oversee the taxes. This resulted in a considerable increase in revenue, most of which was sent to Spain to relieve the dire financial straits of Philip IV.

Other events during his tenure included the following. A heated dispute broke out between Don Juan de Palafox y Mendoza, bishop of Puebla and the Audiencia over whether the bishop could display an emblem of his office publicly on the facade of the cathedral in Puebla. A large fire broke out in the Palace of Cortés. And the legendary Monja Alférez died in Veracruz.

The Tarahumara Indians had been in revolt in the mountains of Chihuahua for several years. They had killed several Franciscan friars, one Jesuit, and some soldiers. They had sacked and leveled some Spanish villages. The viceroy ordered the governor of Durango to establish a presidio at Papigóchic, and he sent troops there to deal with the insurrection. However, the rebels destroyed the fort and continued their pillaging. The Spaniards eventually caught the leader of the rebel, Teporaca. He was hung from a tree. He died "spouting curses against the Spanish and against the cowards in his own force, who had surrendered him". Thereafter the revolt collapsed.

In 1651 and 1652 there was famine in Yucatán. The Indians hid their seeds from the Spanish, but to no effect. They also suffered frightful hunger.

== In Peru ==
As a reward for the large quantity of money he had sent back to Spain, on February 22, 1653 he was named viceroy of Peru. In order to tie up affairs in New Spain, he delayed his departure until August of that year. He took office in Peru on February 24, 1655, and served until December 31, 1661.

In 1657 he founded the Nautical Academy of the colony, at the Hospital of Espiritu Santo in Lima.

There had been a royal mint in Lima briefly, with the king's permission, beginning in 1565, but it was soon closed. Now because of a shortage of coinage, Enríquez de Guzmán ordered it reopened in December 1658, but without the royal authority to do so. It produced coins of 1/4, 1/2, 1, 2, 4 and 8 reales from January 1659 to April 1660, as well as 1 and 8 escudos from September 1659 to April 1660. These are known today as Estrellas de Lima (Stars of Lima), due to the large star featured in their design. Surviving examples are very rare.

Government offices
Preceded by Marcos de Torres y Rueda	Viceroy of New Spain; 1650–1653	Succeeded by Francisco Fernández de la Cueva, 8th Duke of Alburquerque
Preceded by García Sarmiento de Sotomayor	Viceroy of Peru; 1655–1661	Succeeded by Diego de Benavides
