= Burgo de Osma Cathedral =

El Burgo de Osma Cathedral
- Cathedral of the Assumption of Mary
- Catedral de la Asunción de María
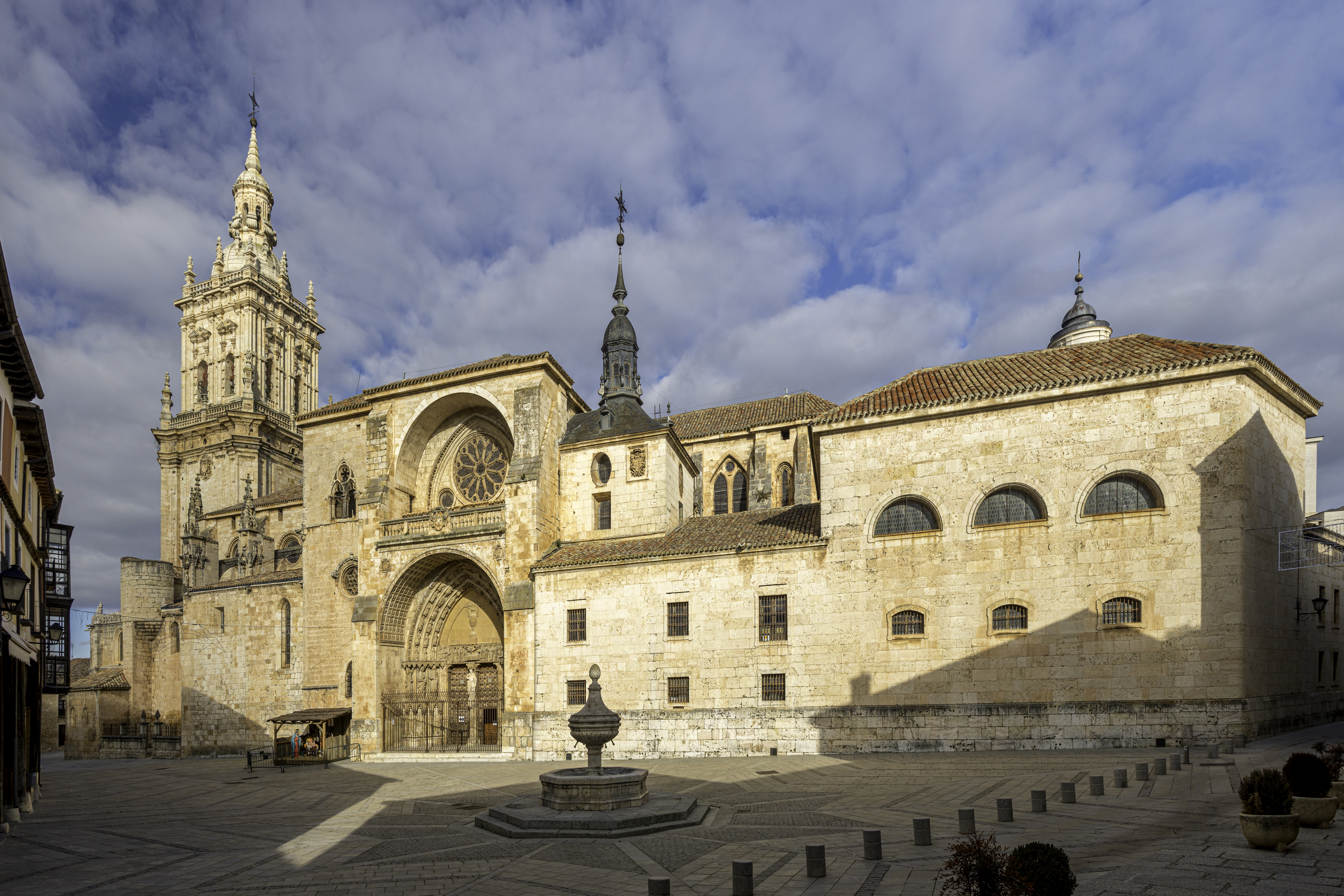
- South façade and tower
- El Burgo de Osma Cathedral
- 41.585629°N 3.071°W
- Location: El Burgo de Osma
- Address: 2, Plaza San Pedro
- Country: Spain
- Denomination: Catholic
- Website: burgodeosmacatedral.com

History
- Status: Cathedral
- Dedication: Assumption of Mary
- Dedicated: 1272

Architecture
- Style: Gothic, Baroque, Neoclassic
- Years built: 1232 - 1784

Administration
- Metropolis: Burgos
- Diocese: Osma-Soria

Clergy
- Bishop: Abilio Martínez Varea

Spanish Cultural Heritage
- Type: Non-movable
- Criteria: Monument
- Designated: 3 June 1902
- Reference no.: RI-51-0000918

The Cathedral of the Assumption of Mary is a Roman Catholic cathedral located in El Burgo de Osma, Spain. It was built in the Gothic architectural style, and was constructed on an area previously occupied by a Romanesque church. It is one of the best preserved medieval buildings in the country, and considered one of the best examples of thirteenth-century gothic architecture in Spain. The building of the church started in 1232, and was completed in 1784. The cloister is from 1512. The tower is from 1739.

== Museum ==
The cathedral museum is home to several items of religious art. Among them is a Commentary on the Apocalypse from 1086.

== Shroud of San Pedro de Osma ==
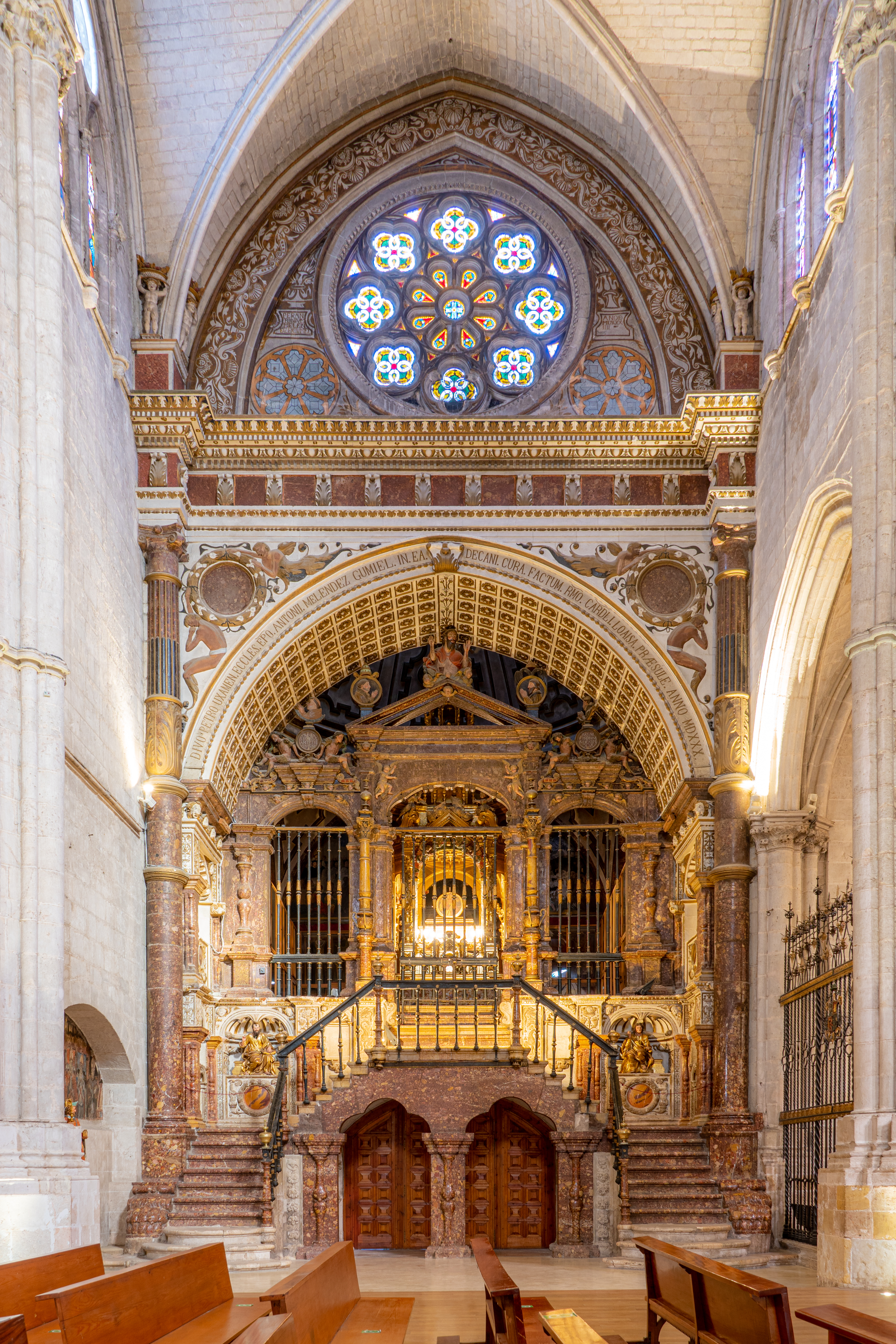
Chapel of San Pedro de Osma.

The Shroud of San Pedro de Osma is a magnificent piece of 12th-century silk, measuring about 50 by 43 centimetres. Found in the Cathedral of Burgo de Osma within the tomb of San Pedro de Osma, it was used in the burial process to wrap the bones of San Pedro de Osma, a bishop who died in 1109. The textile is adorned with gold wrapped thread and decorated with inscriptions, roundels, mirrored images of lions with harpies on their backs, and griffins flanking kneeling men. The silk shroud contains a type of mirrored inscription formation called muthanna, which means doubled in Arabic. The inscription, located within the smaller roundels, states: “This is among the things made at Baghdad, may God protect it!”

While the inscription states that the silk textile was made in Baghdad, and similarly-decorated textiles were surely made there, specific elements of the piece suggest it was made in southern Spain. The spelling of certain words in the inscription is suggestive of the western Islamic lands, and the distinctive lampas weave and the method of interlacing the golden thread are likewise more indicative of textile production in the west. The shroud was also formed in a 2-2-4 formation of warps, a characteristic which denotes a Spanish origin. Accordingly, the specific elements of the shroud are more consistent with silk pieces made in southern Spain. Some scholars have concluded that during the 11th and 12th centuries, imitating Islamic designs and declaring that they were of Islamic origin must have been a relatively common occurrence in Spain at the time.

The shroud is now part of the collection of the Museum of Fine Arts, Boston, after being purchased in 1933.

== Gallery ==
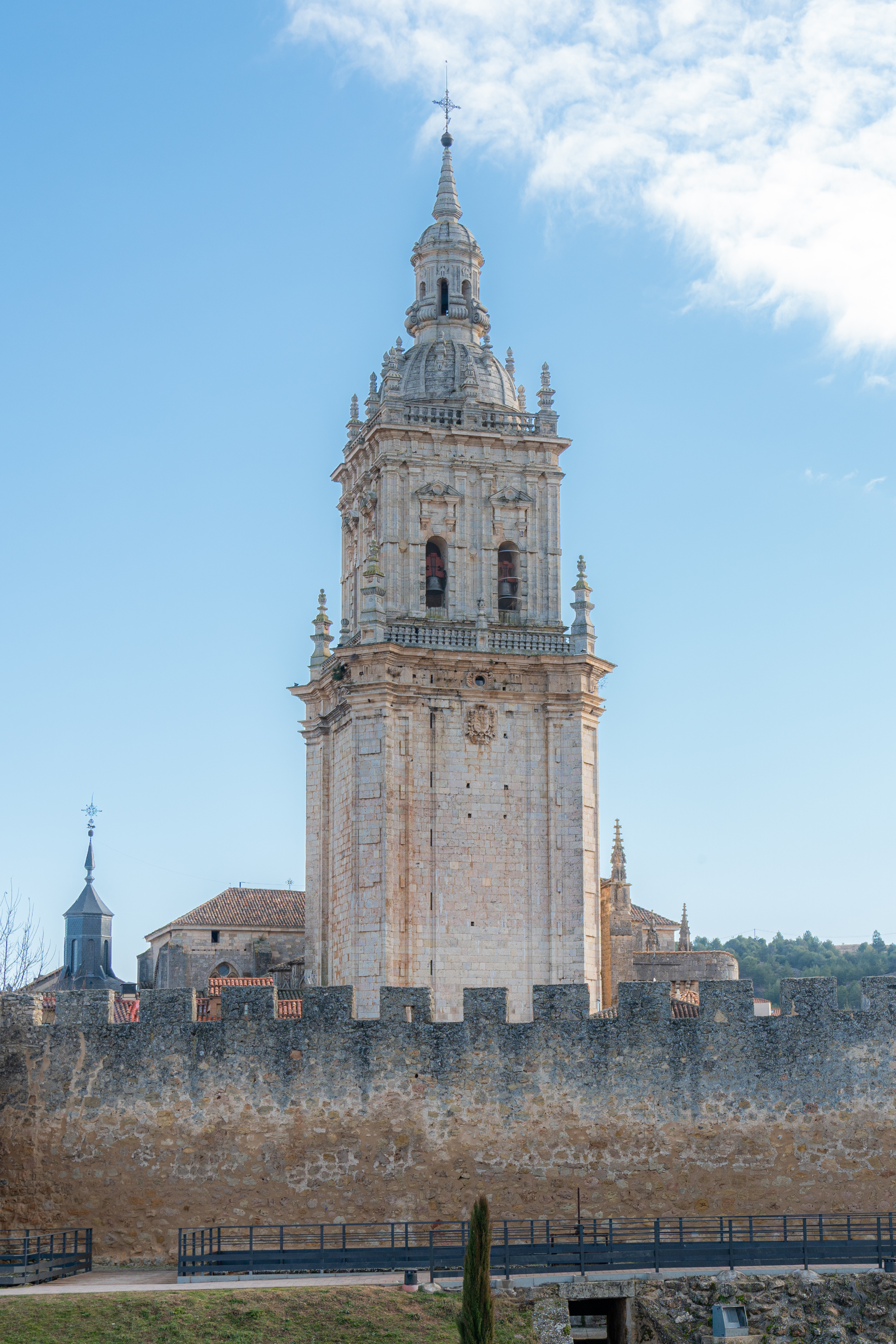
Bell tower and city walls

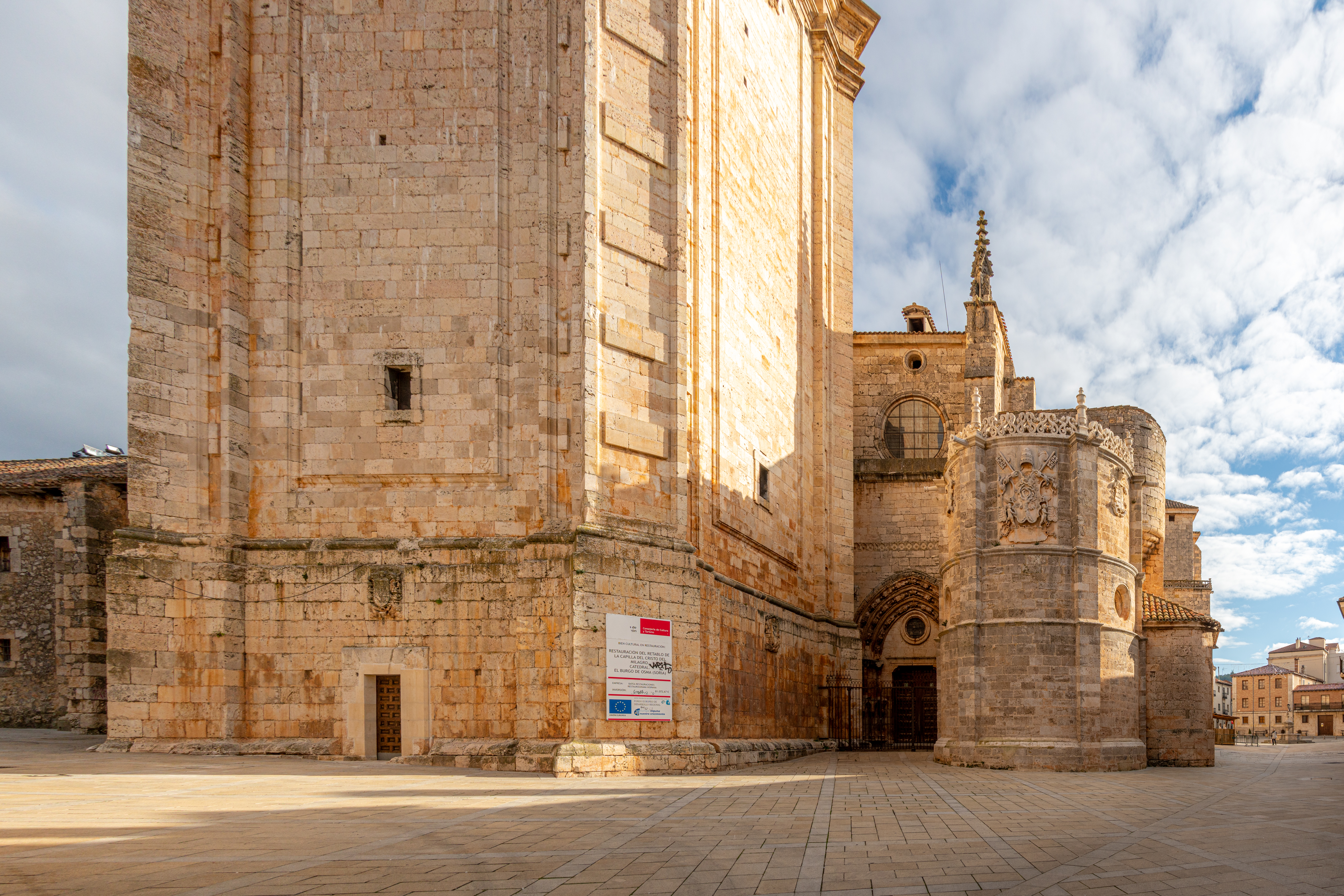
West portico

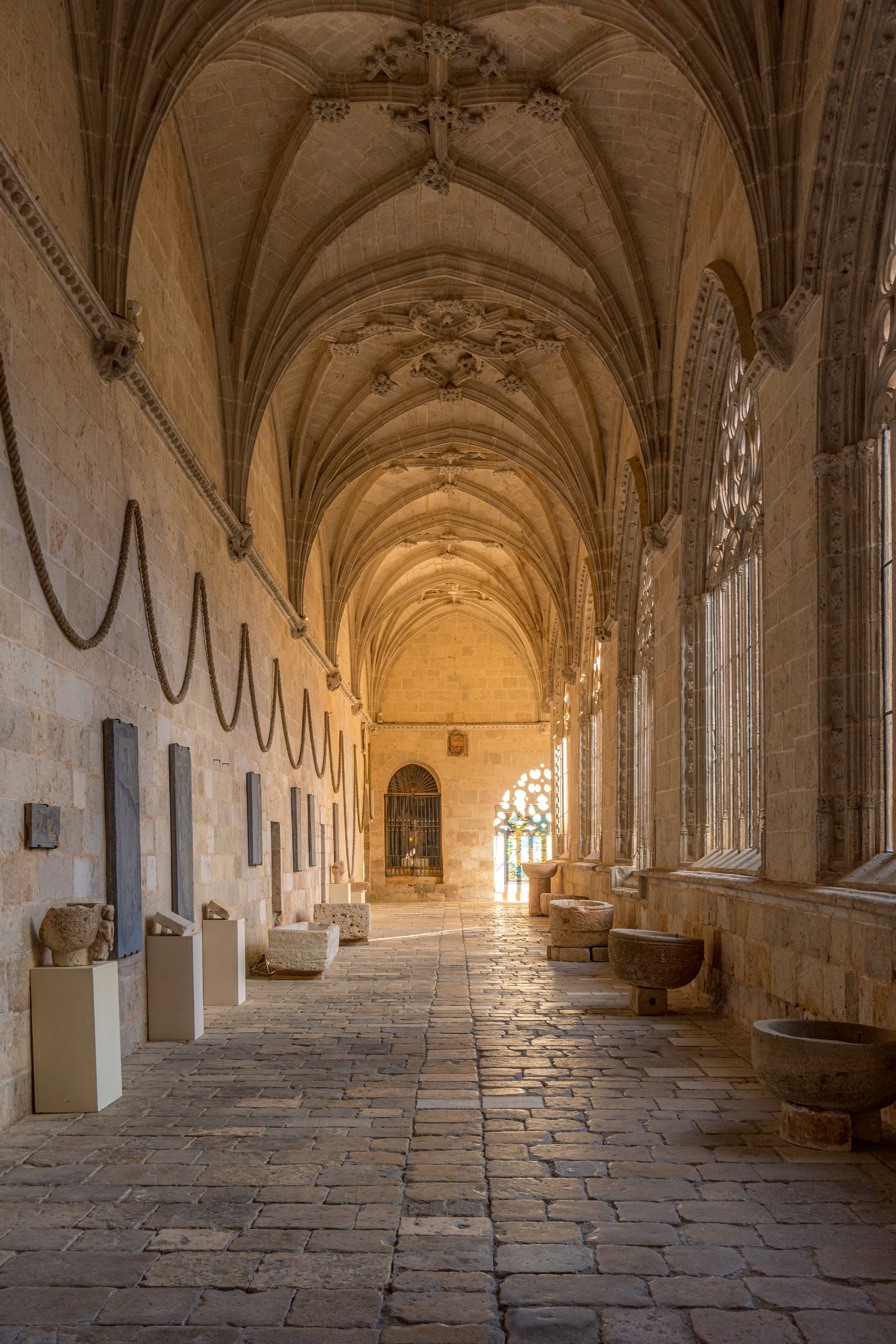
Cloister gallery

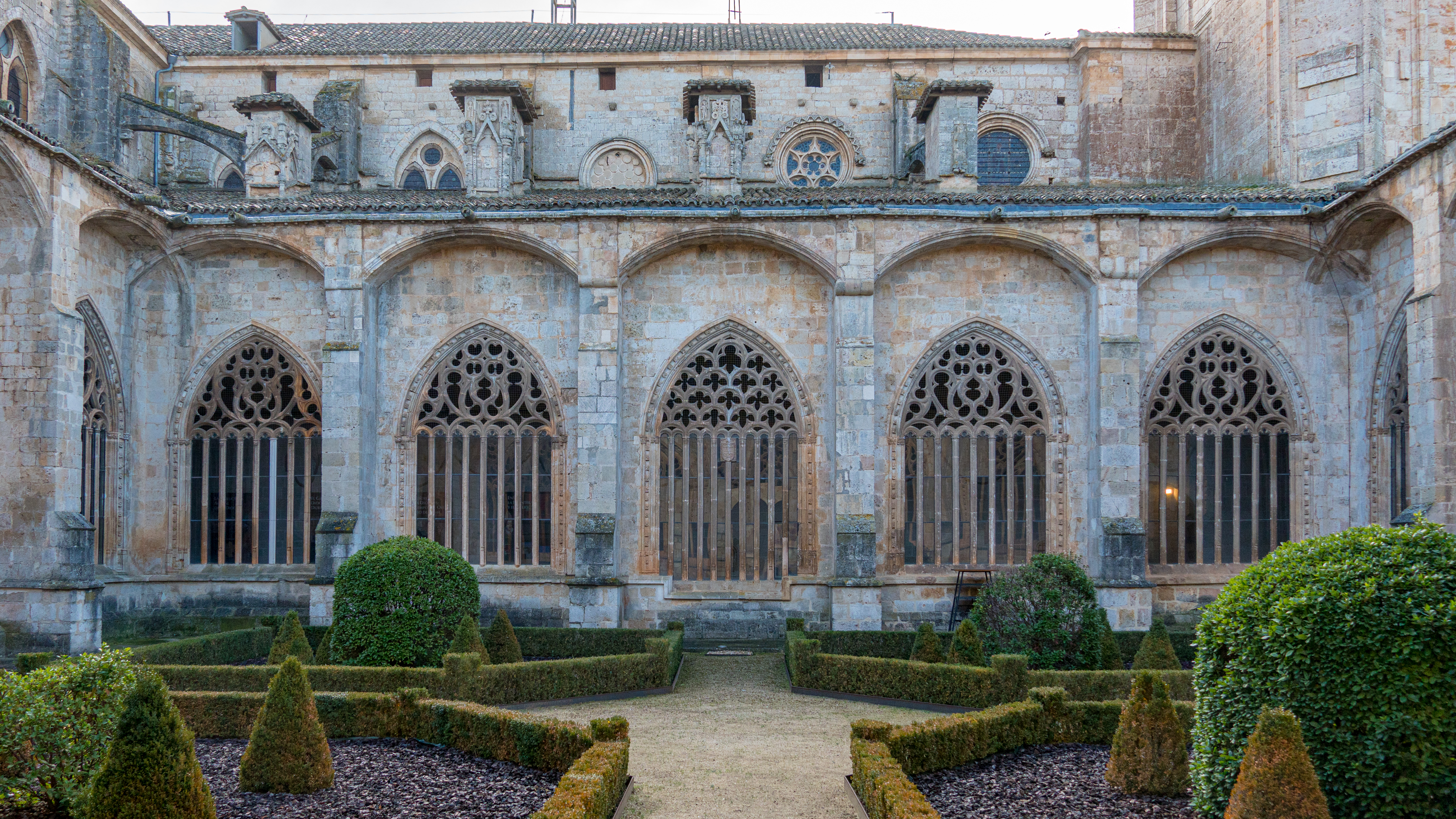
Cloister

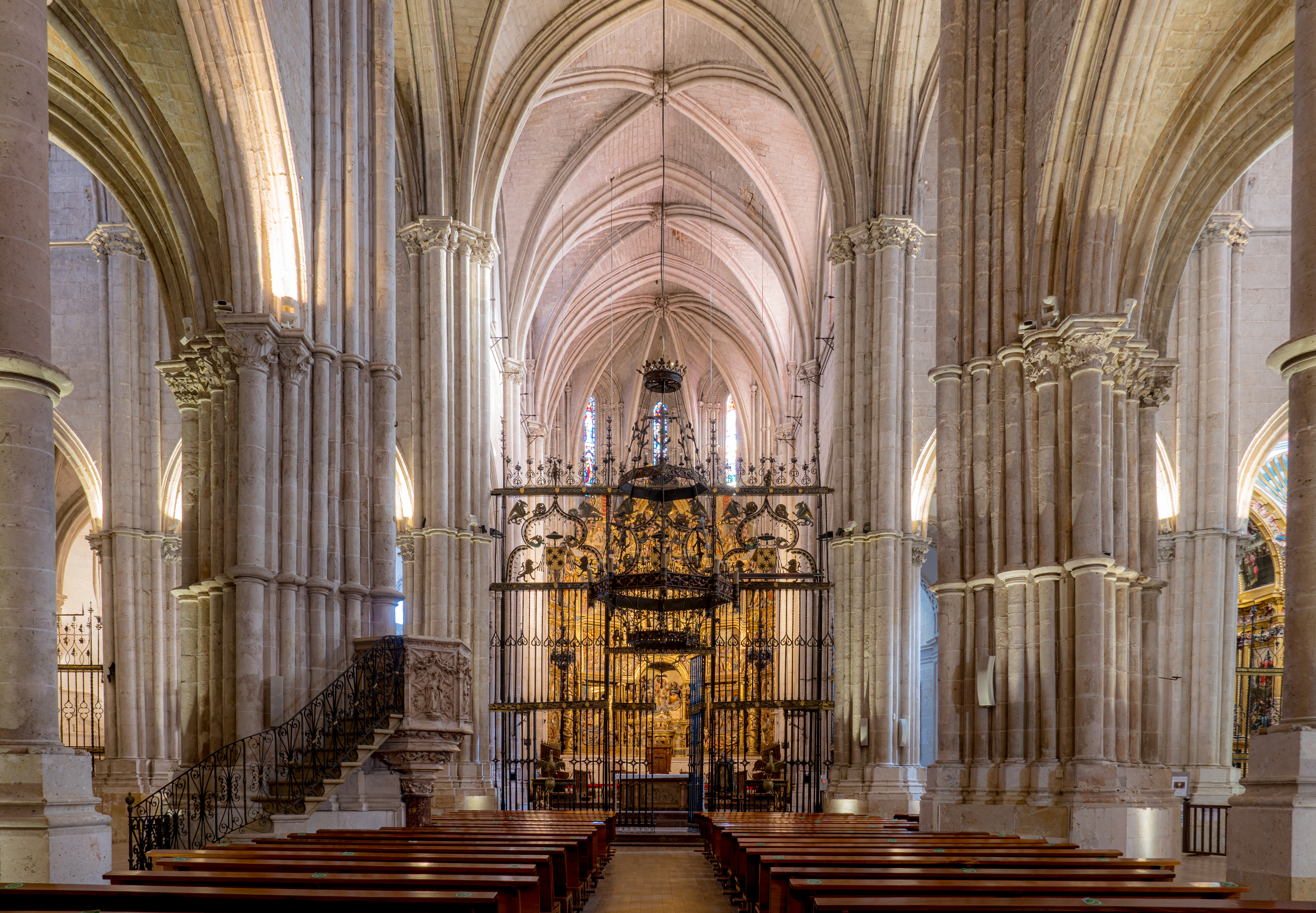
Interior

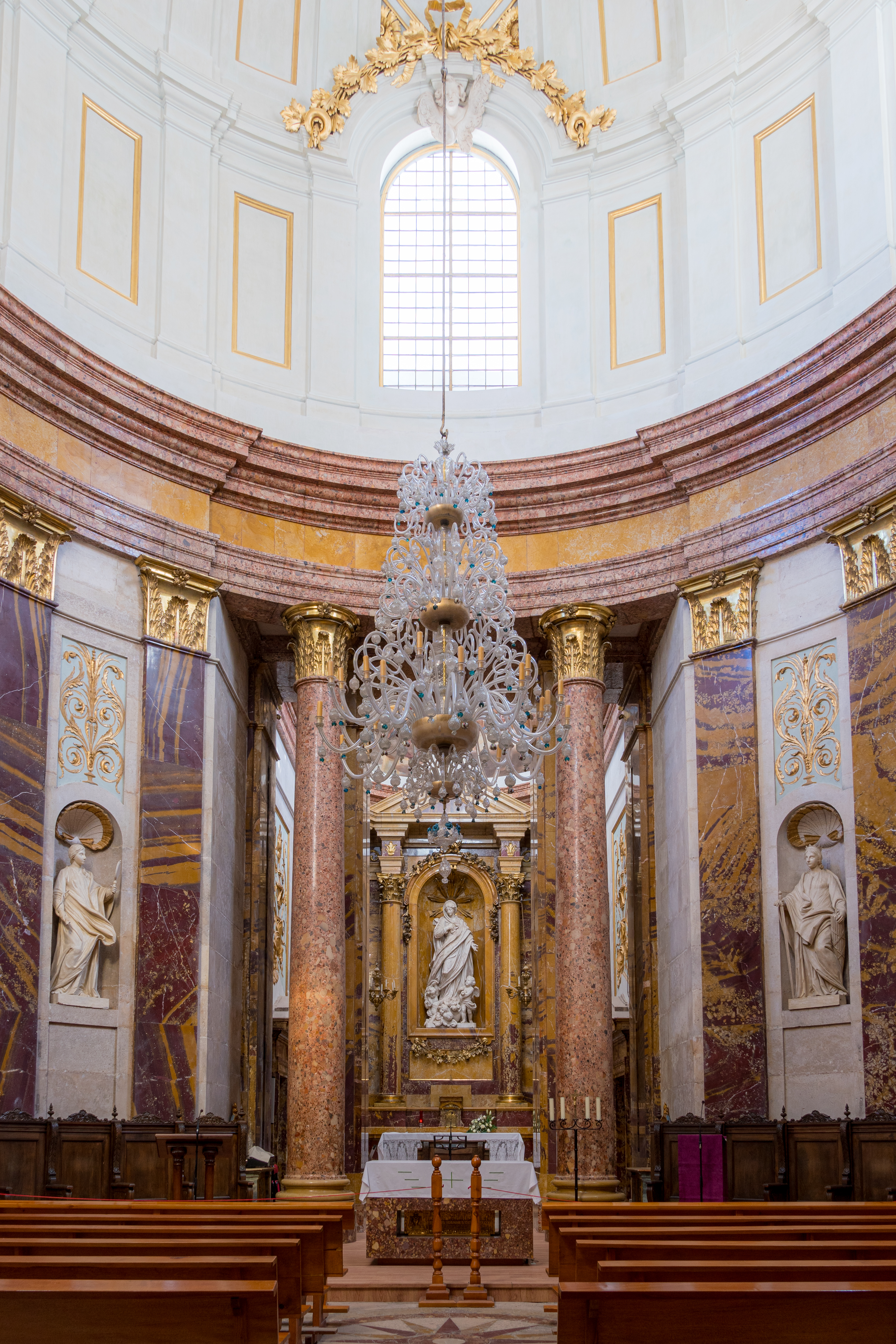
Chapel of Juan de Palafox y Mendoza

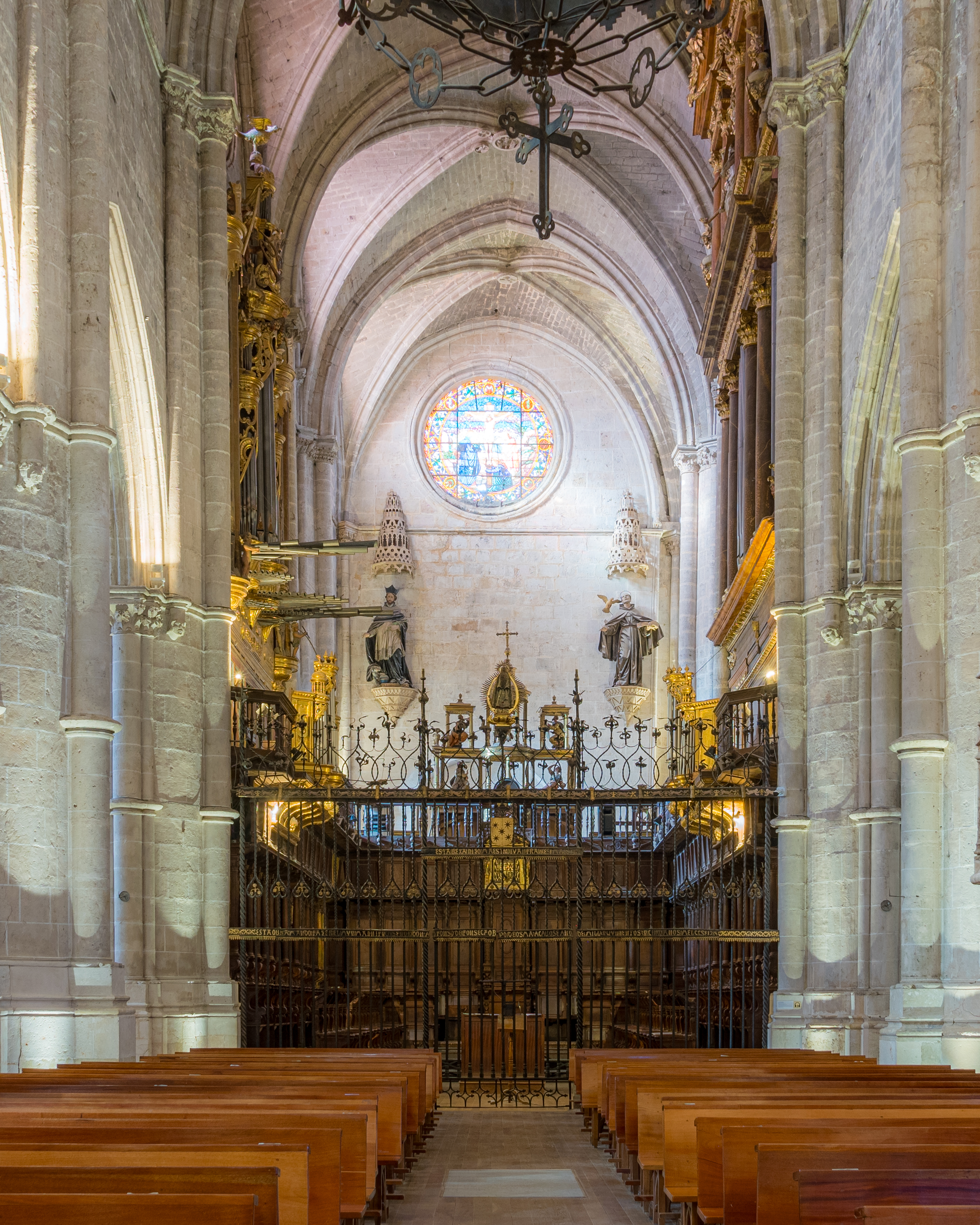
Choir

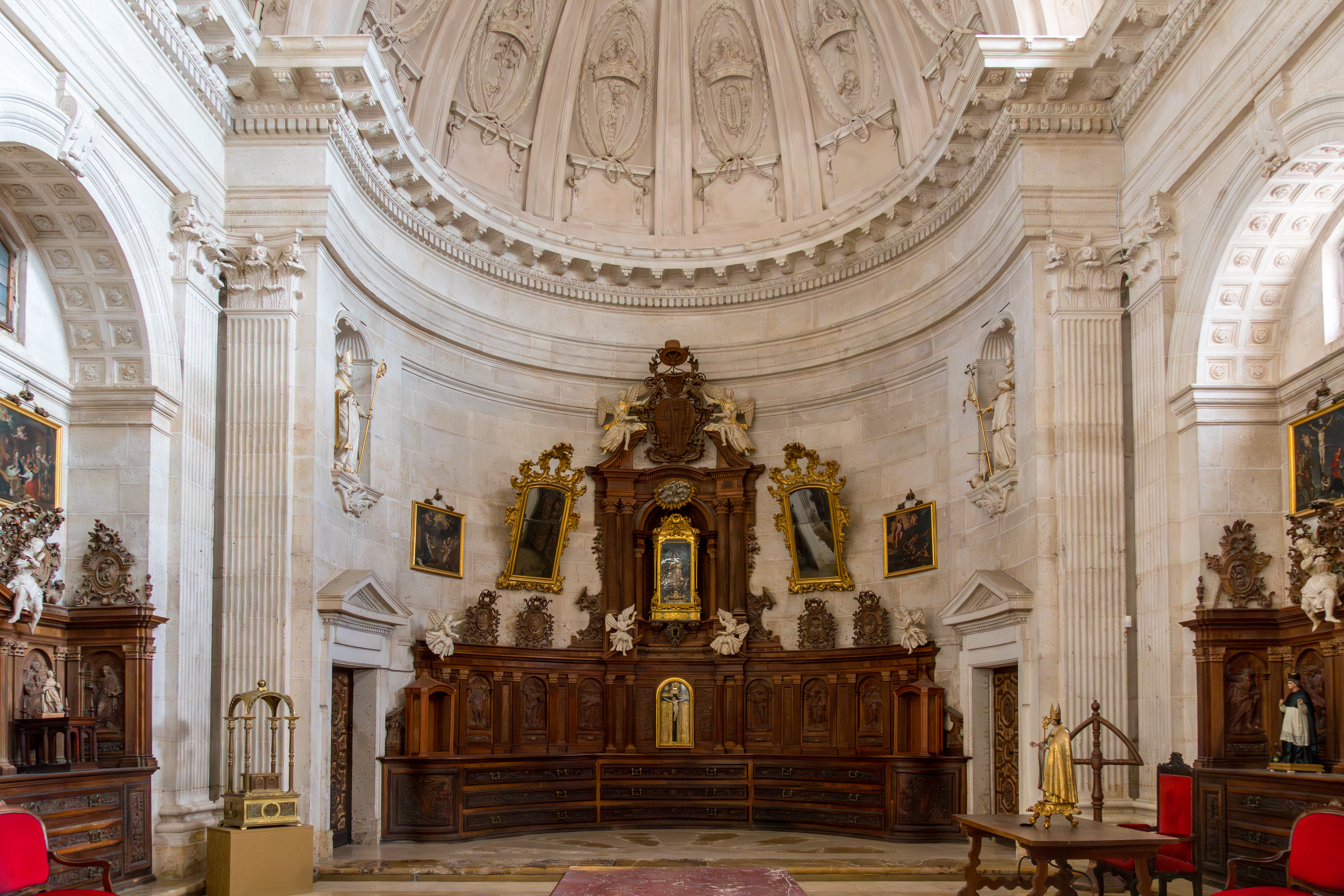
Vestry
