= García Sarmiento de Sotomayor, 2nd Count of Salvatierra =

Mexican politician

The Most Excellent The Count of Salvatierra KOA
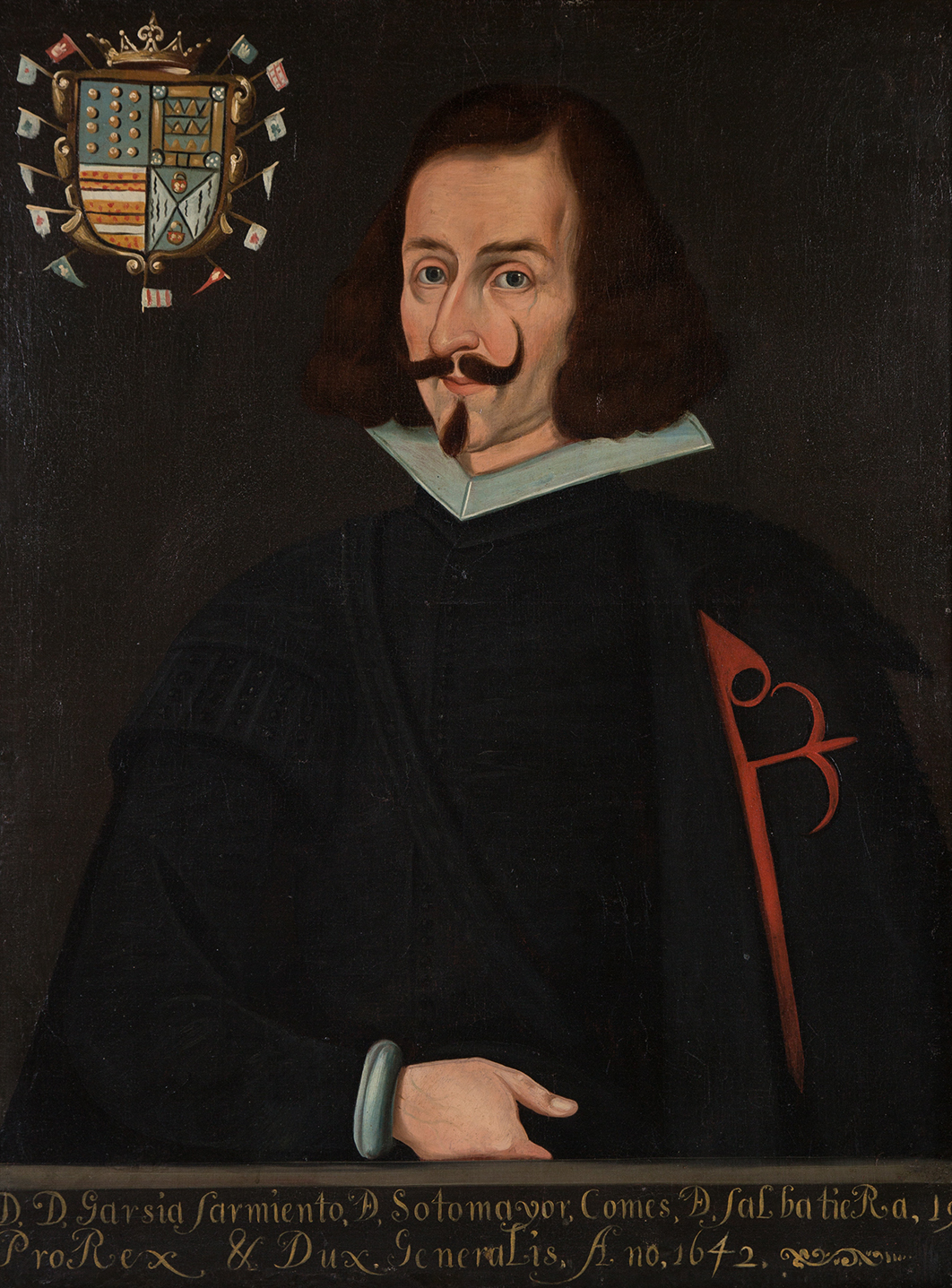

19th Viceroy of New Spain
- In office 23 November 1642 – 13 May 1648
- Monarch: Philip IV
- Valido: Count-Duke of Olivares; Luis de Haro
- Preceded by: Juan de Palafox
- Succeeded by: Marcos de Torres

16th Viceroy of Peru
- In office 20 September 1648 – 24 February 1655
- Monarch: Philip IV
- Valido: Luis de Haro
- Preceded by: The Marquess of Mancera
- Succeeded by: Luis Enríquez de Guzmán

Personal details
- Born: c. 1595 Spain
- Died: 26 June 1659 Lima, Peru
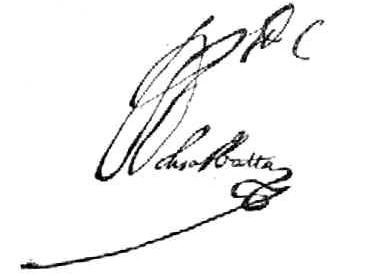
- Signature

Don Diego García Sarmiento de Sotomayor, 2nd Count of Salvatierra, 2nd Marquess of Sobroso (Spanish: Don García Sarmiento de Sotomayor, Marqués de Sobroso y segundo Conde de Salvatierra) (c. 1595, Spain – 26 June 1659, Lima) was a Spanish viceroy of New Spain (23 November 1642 to 13 May 1648) and of Peru (1648 to 1655). He was the 2nd Count of Salvatierra.

== Early life ==
García Sarmiento de Sotomayor was born in Spain in the last decade of the Sixteenth Century. He was a descendant of Don Diego de Sarmiento, a knight commander of the Order of Alcántara and gentleman in waiting to the king. He married the noble woman Doña Antonia de Acuña y de Guzmán, who accompanied him to New Spain as the virreina.

== As Viceroy of New Spain ==
When New Spain Viceroy Diego López Pacheco, 7th Duke of Escalona, a first cousin of King John IV of Portugal, fell under suspicion at the Spanish Court for possible links to the Portuguese, King Philip IV of Spain gave orders to Visitor-general and Bishop of Puebla Don Juan de Palafox y Mendoza to remove the viceroy from office and became viceroy himself. However, his tenure was short lived and the crown named Sarmiento de Sotomayor on 30 July 1642 to replace him. Palafox had hoped to remain as viceroy, since he had plans to undertake a sweeping reform in New Spain, but the crown's appointment of Salvatierra ended that hope. Salvatierra landed in Veracruz in early October 1642 and arrived in Mexico City on 23 November 1642, and took up his duties as viceroy. Palafox remained a powerful figure in New Spain, retaining his posts of visitor-general and Bishop of Puebla (New Spain's second largest city). Palafox had undertaken a vigorous political reform when he was viceroy, which Salvatierra sought to overturn—and succeeded. The period between Salvatierra's 1642 arrival and Palafox's forced departure in 1649 from New Spain for a minor bishopric in Osma, Spain "inaugurated a period of severe political tension, marked by the development of a powerful alliance bent on destroying Palafox's [reform] programme in all its manifestations."

Like earlier viceroys, he was soon faced with major flooding in the city (1645). The canal of Nochistongo was obstructed, and this allowed the water of Lake Zumpango to enter into Lake Mexico, raising its level and flooding parts of the city. The viceroy ordered the canal cleaned and the obstructions removed. This removed the danger to the city.

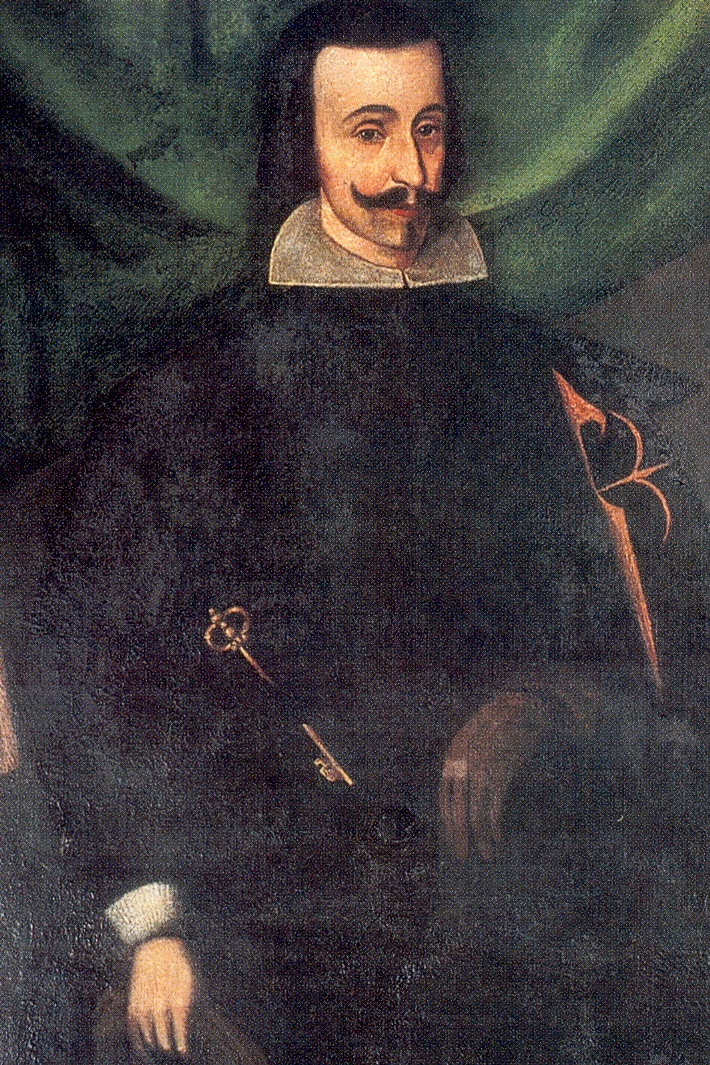

The viceroy sent another expedition (1648) to explore, conquer and colonize the Californias, but the expedition returned without having found lands of much interest. Viceroy Salvatierra also founded the city of Salvatierra, Guanajuato, and established the presidio of Cerro Gordo, on the highway from Mexico City to the mines at Parral. He made peace with various Indian tribes on the northern frontier, and suppressed rebellions by other tribes. He celebrated auto-de-fes in 1647 and 1648. The celebrated Mexican trickster Martín Garatuza was one of those punished in 1648.

Sarmiento de Sotomayor reconstructed the aqueducts supplying water to Mexico City. He required tax stamps on legal documents, something his successors had attempted not very successfully. On 13 May 1648 he turned the government of New Spain over to the new viceroy, Marcos de Torres y Rueda, bishop of Yucatán.

== As Viceroy of Peru ==
That month he departed for Peru, to take up the position of viceroy there. He served as viceroy of Peru until 1655, and remained there until his death in 1659.

Government offices
Preceded by Juan de Palafox	Viceroy of New Spain; 1642–1648	Succeeded by Marcos de Torres
Preceded by The Marquis of Mancera	Viceroy of Peru; 1648–1655	Succeeded by Luis Enríquez de Guzmán
Spanish nobility
Preceded by Diego Sarmiento de Sotomayor	Count of Salvatierra; 1618–1659	Succeeded by Diego Sarmiento de Sotomayor
