= University of Santa Catalina =

- Universidad de Santa Catalina
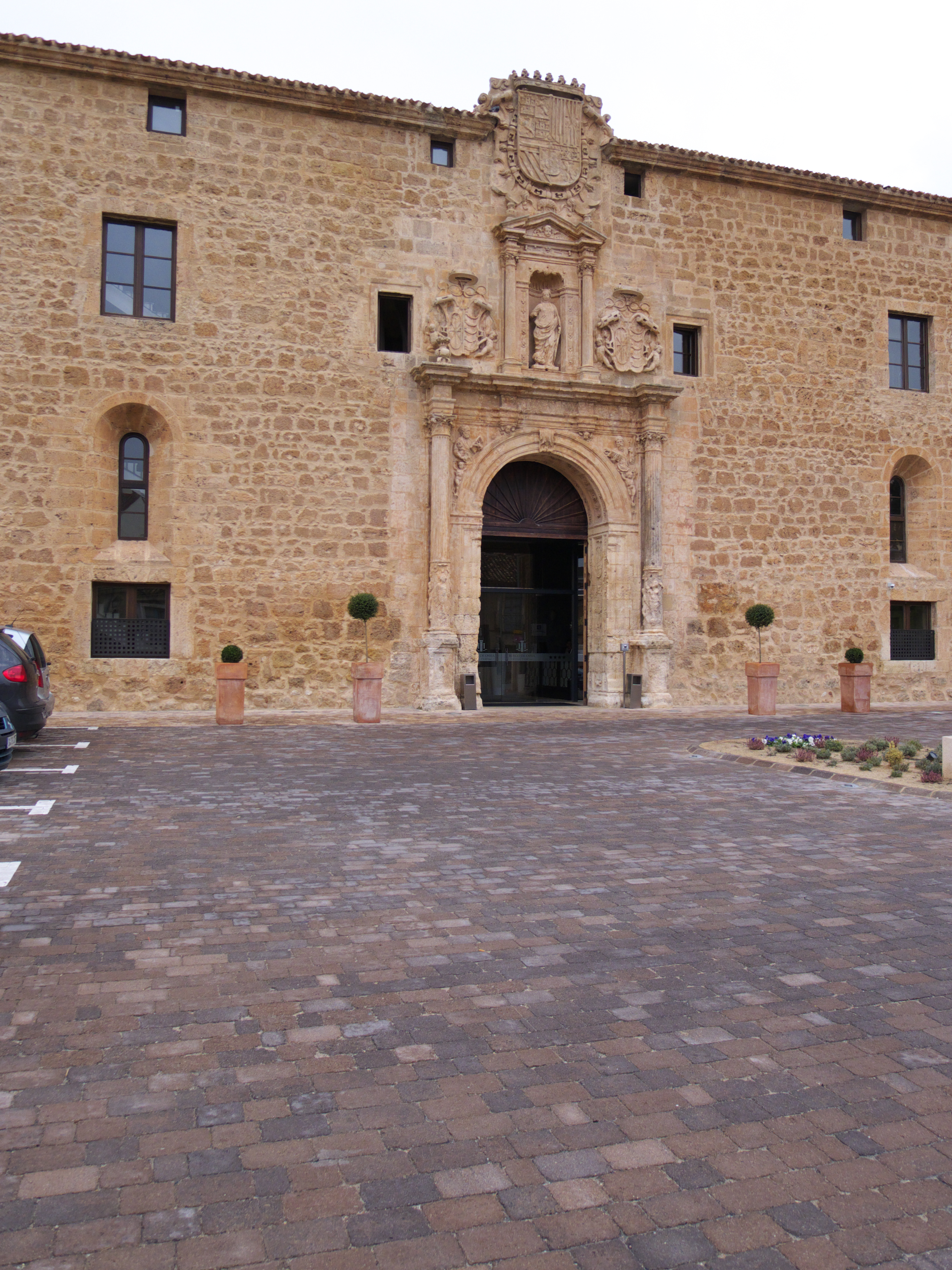
- Active: 1550–1841
- Location: Burgo de Osma-Ciudad de Osma, Soria, Spain; 41°35′16″N 3°03′57″W

The Pontifical and Royal University of St. Catherine or University of Osma (Spanish Pontificia y Real Universidad de Santa Catalina or Universidad de Osma) was founded in 1550 by the Portuguese bishop Pedro Alvarez de Acosta in El Burgo de Osma in Spain. It was closed in 1841. The building that housed the university is now a hotel.

== History ==
=== 1st stage: Greatness (1541 - 1751) ===
The university was founded in 1541 by the Bishop of Osma, Pedro Alvarez de Acosta (1539-1563), with faculties of arts, canon law, medicine and theology; it was authorised on 5 August 1550 by a canonical bull of Pope Julius III, and dedicated to St. Catherine of Alexandria. Philip II of Spain took it under his protection by a royal decree of 31 January 1562. Thus it obtained the double title of a pontifical and a royal university.

=== 2nd stage: Decay (1751 - 1807) ===
Political and educational changes, as well as the lack of economic resources it fell into decline from 1751. Examinations were suspended between 30 October 1770 and 1 December 1778. The university resumed with great intellectual splendour, but during the Peninsular War it closed again on 5 August 1807.

=== 3rd stage: Suspension (1814 - 1841) ===
Although it reopened on 7 October 1814, no studies or professorships were normalised. There was another closure between 19 November 1833 and 1 October 1839, when the university was considered a centre of political turmoil. It was moved to Soria until its final closure during the academic year 1841-1842 after El Burgo de Osma had supported the losing side in the First Carlist War.

The building later became a secondary school, a prison, a vocational institute, and is now the Hotel Termal Burgo de Osma.

A summer school is now held every year in the town using the university's name.

== Building ==
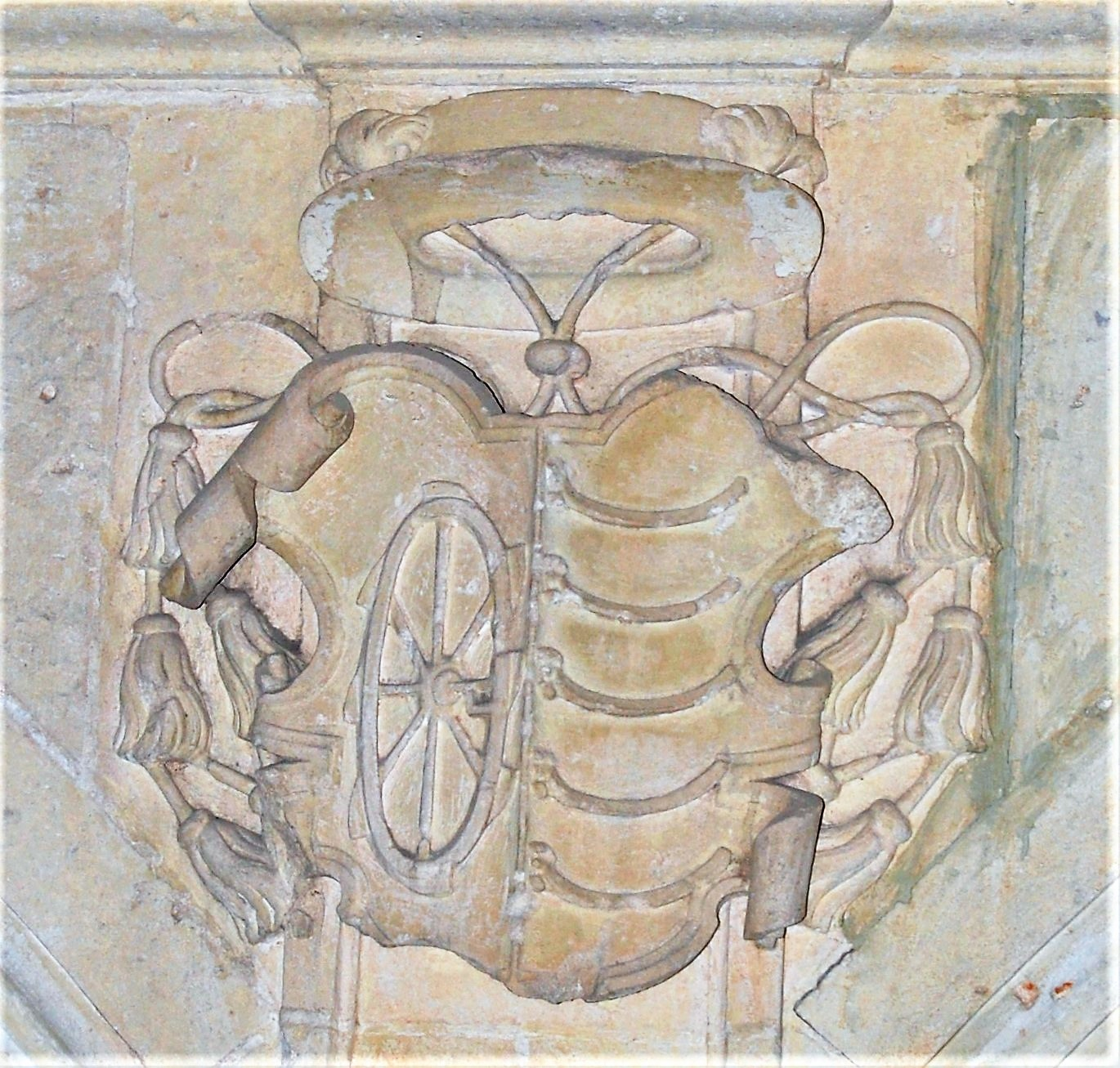
Shield of Bishop Pedro Álvarez de Acosta, including a Catherine wheel.

The building is square, and is structured around a large courtyard with columns. Works started in the year 1541 and were completed in 1549; various reforms were carried out by Bernasconi in 1779.

The façade is in the plateresque style. It has two large columns that are decorated with grotesques and figures in relief at their base, while they appear grooved on the top. On the lintel that frames the main door, the niche between columns contains the image of Saint Catherine of Alexandria, flanked by two coats of arms of Bishop Acosta. A triangular pediment crowns this second body. Above this is the imperial coat of arms of Philip II, from the later period.

Inside it has a square Renaissance courtyard with two floors connected by a monumental staircase. The central courtyard is surrounded by double arches supported by columns of smooth shafts.

== Current use ==
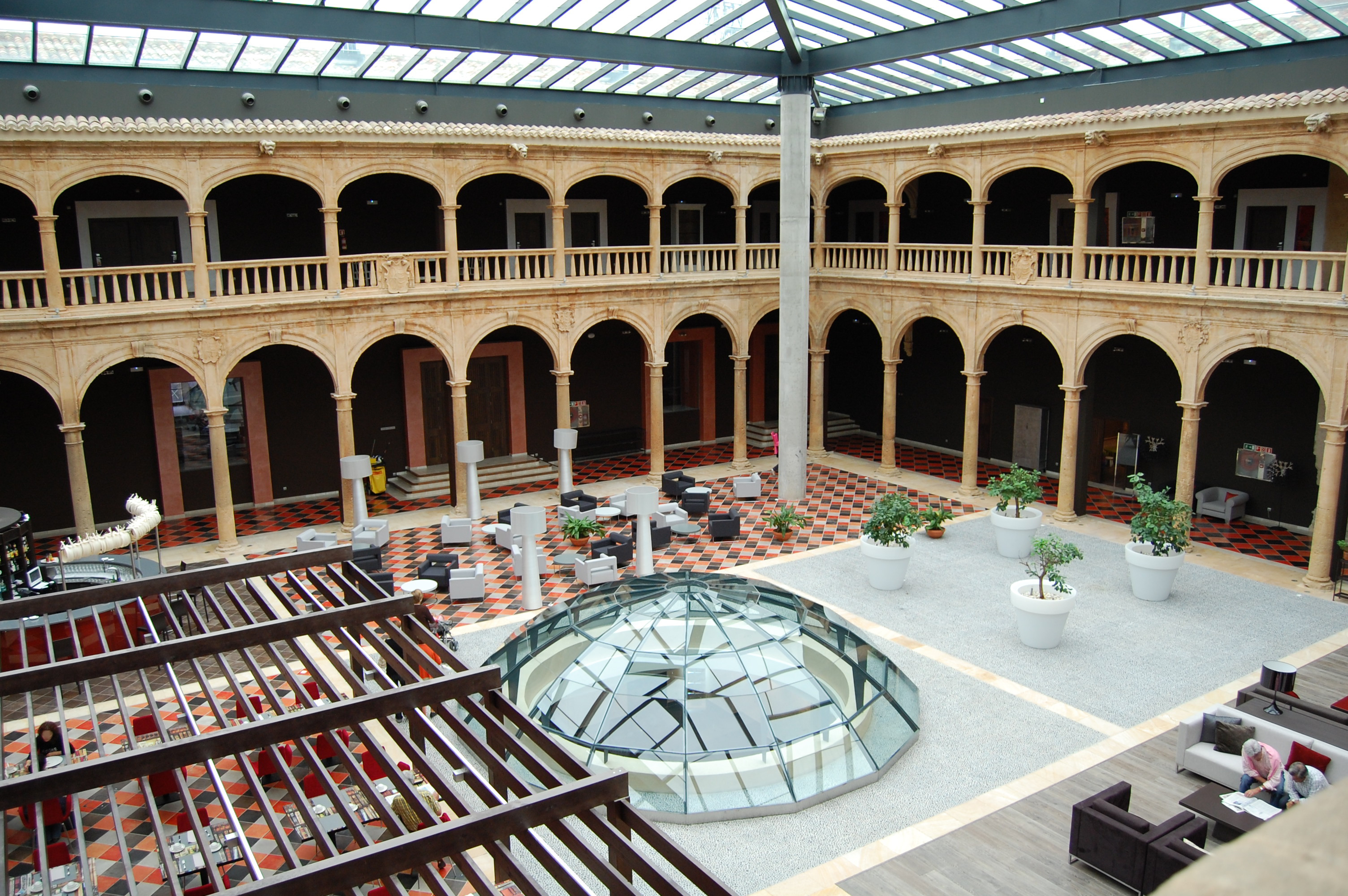
The current patio of the University of Santa Catalina.

La Red de Hosterías Reales de Castilla y León, Castilla Termal y el Grupo Olmedo Hoteles transformed the former university into a quality hotel that includes a thermal area of 1,500 square meters on two basement floors and 62 rooms.

== Alumni ==
- Gaspar Melchor de Jovellanos (1744-1811) writer, jurist and politician.

== Bibliography ==
- Ibáñez G. La Universidad de Santa Catalina de Burgo de Osma. Recuerdo de Soria. 1900; (7):41-6.
- García García M. El Colegio-Universidad de Santa Catalina. Celtiberia. 1959;(17):133–8. 1961;(21):35-50. 1964;(27):127-32.
- Iruela JM. Una Universidad castellana: la de Santa Catalina de El Burgo de Osma. Revista de Soria. 1969;(7-9). 1970;(11).
- Bartolomé Martínez B. Las Cátedras de Gramática en la Universidad del Burgo de Osma (1550-1840). Hispania Sacra. 1976;(XXIX):27-75.
- Bartolomé Martínez B. Brotes de rebeldía y politización en la Universidad de El Burgo de Osma en el siglo XIX. Celtiberia. 1979;(57):111-8.
- Bartolomé Martínez B. Visitas y reformas en el Colegio-Universidad de Santa Catalina de El Burgo de Osma. Historia de la Educación. 1984;(3):27-50.
- Bartolomé Martínez B. El Colegio-Universidad de Santa Catalina en El Burgo de Osma y su tiempo. 1550-1840. Almazán. 1988.
- Frías Balsa JV. Médicos graduados en la Facultad de Medicina de la Universidad de El Burgo de Osma, durante el siglo XVII. Soria Semanal. 5/1/1991; p. 7-8.
- Frías Balsa JV. La Universidad de Santa Catalina (El Burgo de Osma) y América. Celtiberia. 1992; (84):357-8.
