= Marcos de Torres y Rueda =

Mexican politician

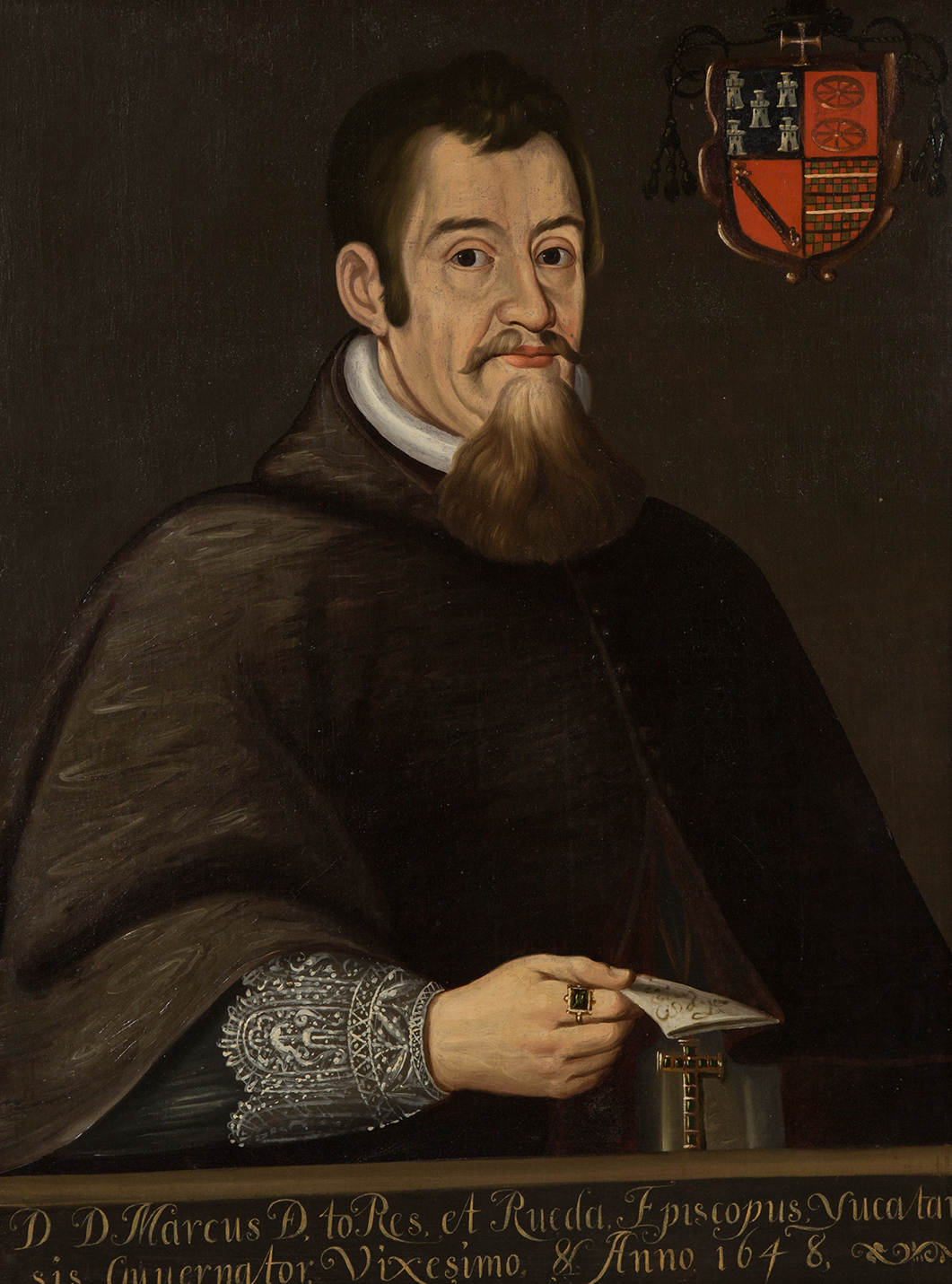
Marcos de Torres y Rueda, interim Viceroy of New Spain

Marcos de Torres y Rueda (April 25, 1591, Almazán, Spain – April 22, 1649, Mexico City) was bishop of Yucatan (1646–1649), interim viceroy of New Spain, and president of the Audiencia of New Spain. He served in office from May 13, 1648, to April 22, 1649. His name is sometimes given as Marcos Torres y Rueda.

== In Spain ==
Marcos de Torres y Rueda was born in Spain in 1591 (some sources say 1588). He studied at the University of Alcalá de Henares, with much distinction, graduating as licenciado in arts. Thereafter he occupied the chair of theology at Alcalá, and also at the University of Valladolid. He was canon of the cathedral of Burgos and rector of the College of San Nicolás in Burgos when King Philip IV of Spain nominated him for bishop of Yucatan. Pope Innocent X named him to fill the position on December 18, 1645.

== In the New World ==
He arrived in New Spain the following year, was consecrated a bishop in Puebla, and took up his position as bishop November 9, 1646. Only a few months later, on July 10, 1647, King Philip IV of Spain named him viceroy and president of the Audiencia.

He arrived in Mexico City and took up his new offices on May 13, 1648, leaving the governance of the Diocese of Yucatan in the hands of the chapter of the cathedral. The outgoing viceroy, García Sarmiento de Sotomayor, 2nd Count of Salvatierra, did not wish to surrender his office or the royal treasury, and direct intervention from the crown was needed.

Because of his other duties, he was not present at the installation of Our Lady of Izamal as patron of Yucatan (August 23, 1648).

He governed the viceroyalty for a little less than one year. The most notable occurrence during this time was the auto de fe held April 11 to April 12, 1649, in the plaza El Volador. There 13 men and women were garroted to death and another 94 received lashes. In the former group was Tomás Tremiño de Campos, a Portuguese Jew. Among the things he was accused of were using the "Mexican language" and speaking ill of the Holy Office of the Inquisition, the king and the pope. Antonio Báez and B. Tirado were accused of saying "Christians are beasts". Pedro Mercado was accused of giving preferential seating to Jews at a comedy he produced.

By this point very ill, the viceroy did not attend the event. He died shortly after in Mexico City.

On April 14, 1649, days before the viceroy's death, a revolt broke out among the Tarahumara Indians in northern New Spain. Torres y Rueda was too ill to deal with it, and it was left to his successor, Luis Enríquez de Guzmán, conde de Alba de Liste.

Torres y Rueda died April 22, 1649, in Mexico City. He was interred in the church of the convent of San Agustín. The Audiencia (high court) took up the government, pending the arrival of the new viceroy.

Although he performed the functions of viceroy and his name consistently appears in the lists of viceroys of New Spain, technically Torres y Rueda never formally held the title. His title was gobernador (governor). Because he was not fully empowered as viceroy, he could not make appointments to office or remove officeholders, which left viceroy Salvatierra's clients in place. Torres y Rueda was initially a firm supporter of Palafox, and so when offices became vacant, Torres appointed American-born Spaniards, following Palafox's aim to favor them over peninsular-born candidates. Furthermore, he dismissed complaints by the Jesuits against Palafox about Palafox's putting education in the hands of the secular clergy in Puebla and removing it from Jesuits. Torres wrote the king that "he was in entire agreement with the bishop of Puebla [Palafox] over how New Spain should be governed." However, Torres subsequently abandoned his support of Palafox and reform. Torres's advisers were major figures who supported viceroy Salvatierra. Torres himself started pursuing practices that brought wealth to himself, including deals with judges and merchants allowing him amass a huge fortune.
