= Burgo de Osma-Ciudad de Osma =

El Burgo de Osma
- Municipality
- Burgo de Osma-Ciudad de Osma
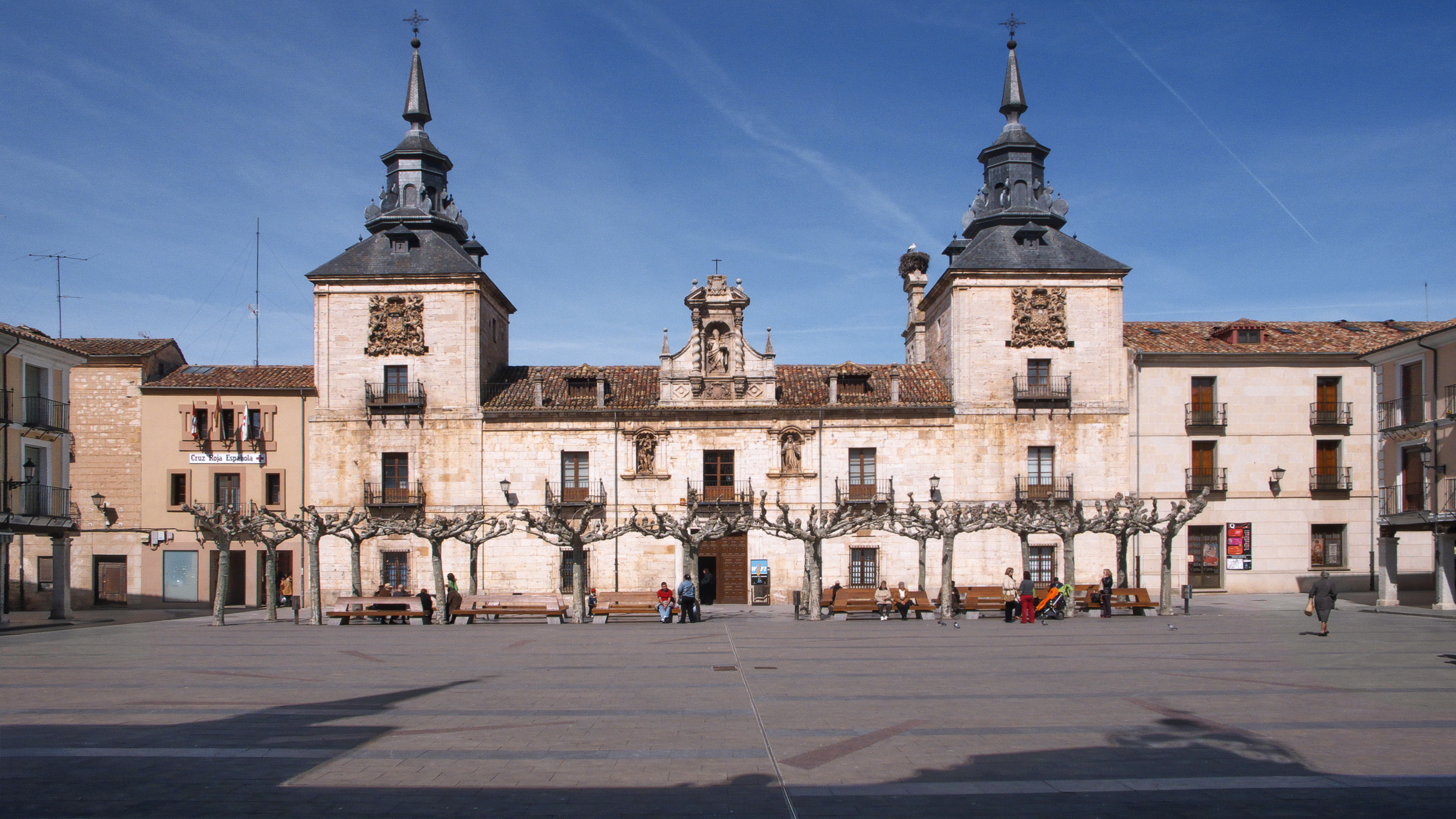
- Antiguo Hospital de San Agustín

- Flag Coat of arms
- Interactive map of El Burgo de Osma
- Coordinates: 41°35′N 3°4′W
- Country: Spain
- Autonomous community: Castile and León
- Province: Soria
- Comarca: Tierras del Burgo
- Judicial district: Burgo de Osma

Government
  - Mayor: Antonio Pardo Capilla (PP)

Area
  - Total: 289.35 km^{2} (111.72 sq mi)
- Elevation: 906 m (2,972 ft)

Population (2025-01-01)
  - Total: 5,283
  - Density: 18.26/km^{2} (47.29/sq mi)
- Demonym: Burgenses
- Time zone: UTC+1 (CET)
  - Summer (DST): UTC+2 (CEST)
- Postal code: 42300
- Dialing code: 975
- Website: Official website

Spanish Cultural Heritage
- Type: Non-movable
- Criteria: Historic ensemble
- Designated: 24 June 1993
- Reference no.: RI-53-0000462

Burgo de Osma-Ciudad de Osma is the third-largest municipality in the province of Soria, in the autonomous community of Castile and León, Spain. It has a population of about 5,250.

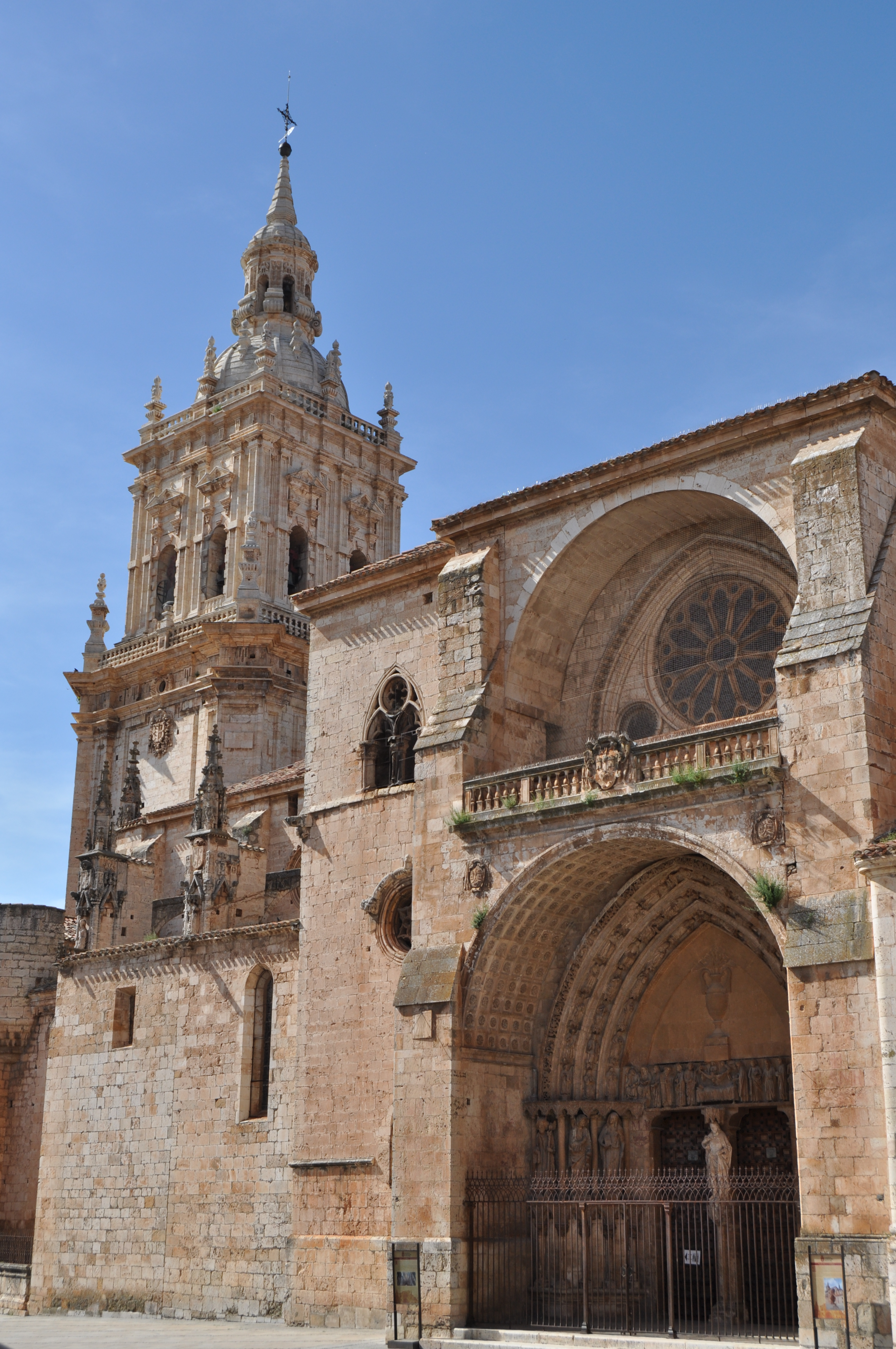
The Burgo de Osma Cathedral, founded in 1232.

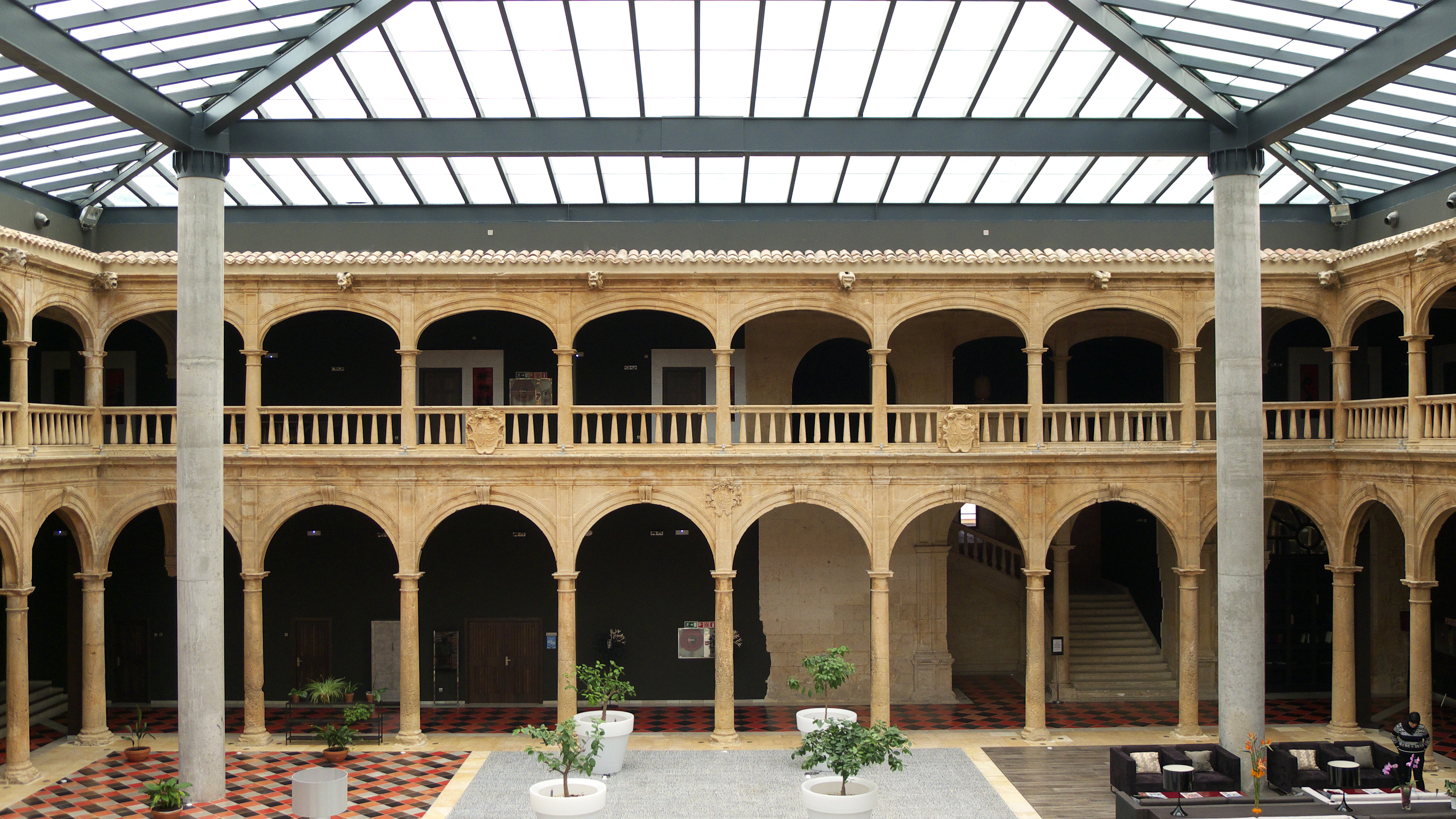
Old University of Santa Catalina

It is made up of two parts:

- the smaller Ciudad de Osma (city of Osma) to the west of the river Ucero, which flows southwards to the river Duero; and
- the larger El Burgo de Osma (the borough of Osma, sometimes just called El Burgo) to the east of the river Ucero, the cathedral town of the province.

Osma derives from the Celto-Roman Uxama, while Burgo is cognate to the English word borough.

== History ==
Burgo de Osma is well-known for its cultural heritage that includes the Burgo de Osma Cathedral, the University of Santa Catalina, the Castle, Plaza Mayor and Hospital de San Agustín (baroque architecture) and the Holy Week parade.

== See also ==
- Uxama Argaela
