= Pedro García Ferrer =

Spanish painter (1583–1660)

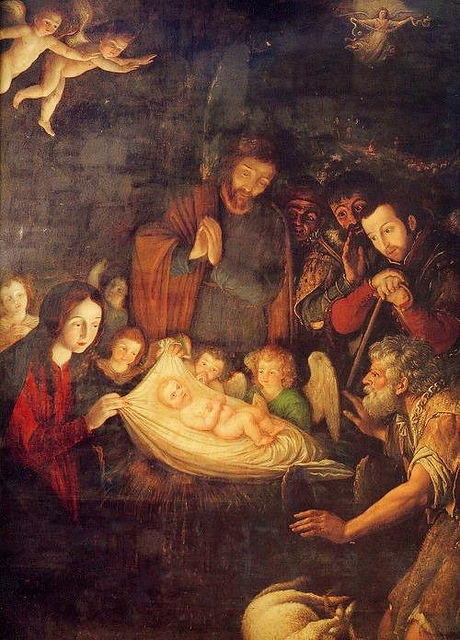
Adoration of the Shepherds, altarpiece of the Chapel of the Kings in Puebla Cathedral, by Pedro García Ferrer

Pedro García Ferrer (1583–1660), the Licentiate, an ecclesiastic and painter of some reputation at Valencia, executed some pictures for the altar of San Vicente Ferrer in the convent of San Domingo, and practised his art at Madrid. Cean Bermudez mentions a Crucifixion by him, dated 1632, then in the possession of Don Mariano Ferrer, secretary of the Academy of San Carlos.
