= 2017 in Cuba =

- Decades: 1990s; 2000s; 2010s; 2020s
- See also: Other events of 2017; Timeline of Cuban history

Events in the year 2017 in Cuba.

== Incumbents ==
- First Secretary of the Communist Party of Cuba: Raúl Castro
  - Second Secretary: José Ramón Machado Ventura
- President of the Council of State: Raúl Castro
  - First Vice President: Miguel Díaz-Canel

== Events ==
- 29 September – US government order to cut diplomats staff member in Cuba Embassy, due to a mysterious attack.

== Deaths ==
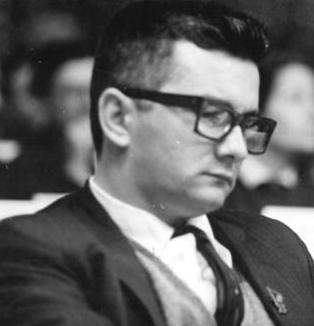
Armando Hart

- 7 January – Carlos Fernández Gondín, 78, politician (b. 1938).
- 26 January – Mario Quintero, 92, basketball player (b. 1924).
- 12 June – Fernando Martínez Heredia, 79, politician (b. 1939)
- 26 November – Armando Hart, 87, politician (b. 1930).
