= 2018 in Cuba =

- Decades: 1990s; 2000s; 2010s; 2020s
- See also: Other events of 2018; Timeline of Cuban history

Events in the year 2018 in Cuba.

== Incumbents ==
- First Secretary of the Communist Party of Cuba: Raúl Castro
  - Second Secretary of the Communist Party of Cuba: José Ramón Machado Ventura
- President: Raúl Castro → Miguel Díaz-Canel
  - First Vice President: Miguel Díaz-Canel → Salvador Valdés Mesa

== Events ==
- 11 March – the 2018 Cuban parliamentary election is held.
- 19 April – Miguel Díaz-Canel is sworn in as President of the Council of State, marking the first time since 1959 that neither Castro brother is leading Cuba. Raúl Castro remained the First Secretary of the Communist Party of Cuba, the most senior position in the one-party socialist state.
- 21 April – Venezuelan President Nicolás Maduro is the first foreign leader to meet with President Miguel Díaz-Canel.
- 18 May – Cubana de Aviación Flight 972 crashes shortly after takeoff from the José Martí International Airport, killing all but one of the 113 people on board.

== Deaths ==
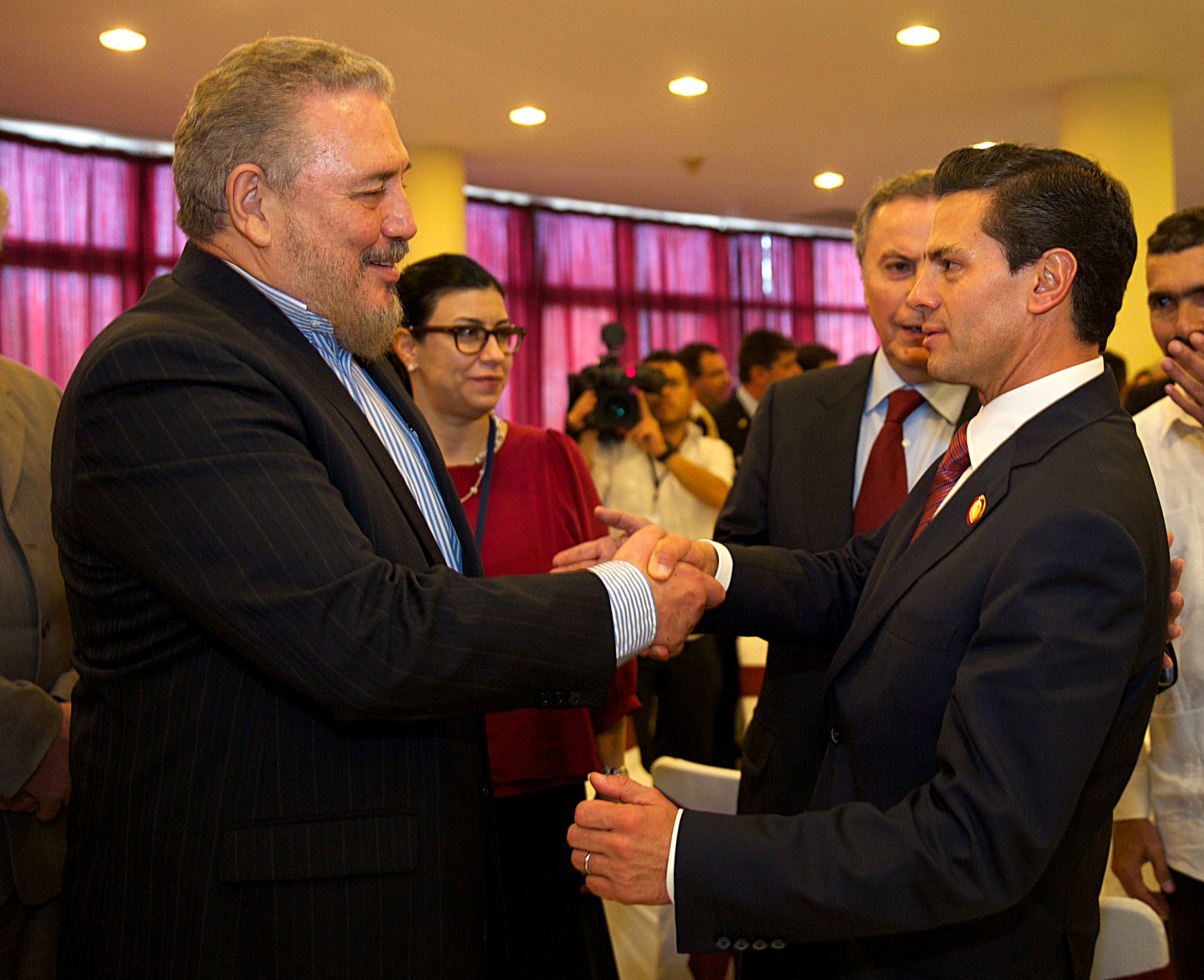
Fidel Castro Díaz-Balart (left)

- 12 January – Rudy Árias, baseball player (b. 1931).
- 1 February – Fidel Castro Díaz-Balart, nuclear physicist and government official (b. 1949)
- 4 March – José Triana, 87, Cuban poet.
- 16 March – Milán Matos, 68, Cuban long jumper.
- 23 May – Luis Posada Carriles, Cuban terrorist (b. 1928)
- 18 July – Pedro Pérez, triple jumper (b. 1952).
