= 2015 in Cuba =

- Decades: 1990s; 2000s; 2010s; 2020s
- See also: Other events of 2015; Timeline of Cuban history

The following lists events that happened during 2015 in Cuba.

== Incumbents ==
- First Secretary of the Communist Party of Cuba: Raúl Castro
  - Second Secretary: José Ramón Machado Ventura
- President of the Council of State: Raúl Castro
  - First Vice President: Miguel Díaz-Canel

== Events ==
=== April ===
- April 10 - Cuba debuts in the Summit of the Americas on its seventh edition.

=== May ===
- May 29 - Cuba is officially removed from the US State Sponsors of Terrorism list.
