= 2016 in Cuba =

- Decades: 1990s; 2000s; 2010s; 2020s
- See also: Other events of 2016; Timeline of Cuban history

The following lists events that happened during 2016 in Cuba.

== Incumbents ==
- First Secretary of the Communist Party of Cuba: Raúl Castro
  - Second Secretary: José Ramón Machado Ventura
- President of the Council of State: Raúl Castro
  - First Vice President: Miguel Díaz-Canel

== Events ==
- March 21 - President Barack Obama made a state visit to Cuba.
- August 5–21 - 62 athletes from Cuba competed at the 2016 Summer Olympics in Rio de Janeiro, Brazil.

== Deaths ==
- November 25 – Fidel Castro, Former President of Cuba (b. 1926).

== See also ==
- Cuba at the 2016 Summer Olympics
