= 1959 in Cuba =

- Decades: 1930s; 1940s; 1950s; 1960s; 1970s
- See also: Other events of 1959; Timeline of Cuban history

The following lists events that happened during 1959 in Cuba.

== Incumbents ==
- President:
  - until January 1: Fulgencio Batista
  - January 1-January 2: Anselmo Alliegro y Milá
  - January 2-January 3: Carlos Manuel Piedra
  - January 3-July 18: Manuel Urrutia Lleó
  - starting July 18: Osvaldo Dorticós Torrado
- Prime Minister:
  - until January 1: Gonzalo Güell
  - January 1-February 13: José Miró Cardona
  - February 13-February 16: vacant
  - starting February 16: Fidel Castro

== Events ==
=== January ===
- January 1 - President Fulgencio Batista fled to the Dominican Republic as the forces of Fidel Castro closed in. Before leaving, Batista named Judge Carlos Manuel Piedra as provisional president. Piedra ordered a cease-fire moments after taking office. At 10:00 pm, the ships F.M. Robinson, Jack W. Wilke and the Peterson were directed to sail to Cuba to evacuate Americans if necessary.
- January 2 - As Castro's rebel forces rolled into Havana, the 32-year-old leader named Dr. Manuel Urrutia Lleo as President of Cuba.
- January 7 - Cuba's new government announced the first executions of former officials of Fulgencio Batista. Ten officers were executed at Santiago including Col. Arcadio Casillas, who oversaw Santiago. The same day, the United States recognized the new Cuban government of Fidel Castro.
- January 8 - Fidel Castro was greeted by cheering crowds as he made a triumphant entry into Havana.
- January 12 - In the largest mass execution of former officials since Castro's victory, Cuban communists shot 71 supporters of Fulgencio Batista over a seven-hour period, then buried them in a mass grave.
