= 2013 in Cuba =

- Decades: 1990s; 2000s; 2010s; 2020s
- See also: Other events of 2013; Timeline of Cuban history

The following lists events that happened during 2013 in Cuba.

== Incumbents ==
- President: Raúl Castro
- Vice President: José Ramón Machado Ventura (until 24 February), Miguel Díaz-Canel (starting 24 February)
- Prime Minister: Raúl Castro
- President of the National Assembly: Ricardo Alarcón (until 24 February), Esteban Lazo Hernández (starting 24 February)
