= 2014 in Cuba =

- Decades: 1990s; 2000s; 2010s; 2020s
- See also: Other events of 2014; Timeline of Cuban history

The following lists events that happened during 2014 in Cuba.

== Incumbents ==
- First Secretary of the Communist Party of Cuba: Raúl Castro
  - Second Secretary: José Ramón Machado Ventura
- President of the Council of State: Raúl Castro
  - First Vice President: Miguel Díaz-Canel

== Events ==
=== January ===
- January 9 - A 5.1 magnitude earthquake occurs in the Straits of Florida about 112 miles east of Havana swaying medium rise buildings in city.

=== February ===
- February 11 - Talks between Cuba and the European Union occur on restoring ties.

=== July ===
- July 1 - The United States imposes a record $9 billion fine on BNP Paribas for helping clients bypass sanctions against Cuba, Iran, and Sudan. The bank is also barred from certain US dollar dominated transactions for one year.
- July 16 - Russia and Cuba agree on reopening the biggest Soviet era espionage base outside of Russia.

=== September ===
- September 12 - Cuba announces plans to send 165 medical staff to West Africa to help combat the Ebola virus outbreak that has claimed more than 2,400 lives.

=== November ===
- November 13 - Cuba defends North Korea by circulating an amendment to a European-Japanese draft resolution recommending the referral of North Korea to the International Criminal Court for crimes against humanity.

=== December ===
- December 17 - The United States and Cuba re-establish diplomatic relations after severing them 55 years ago. An American embassy will open in Havana and talks to lift the embargo will begin.
- December 18 - A former US intelligence officer identifies Rolando "Rollie" Sarraff Trujillo as the Cuban Interior Ministry spy for the US Central Intelligence Agency, who was swapped in exchange for members of the Cuban Five.
