= 2019 in Cuba =

- Decades: 1990s; 2000s; 2010s; 2020s
- See also: Other events of 2019; Timeline of Cuban history

Events in the year 2019 in Cuba.

== Incumbents ==
- First Secretary of the Communist Party of Cuba: Raúl Castro
  - Second Secretary of the Communist Party of Cuba: José Ramón Machado Ventura
- President: Miguel Díaz-Canel
  - First Vice President: Salvador Valdés Mesa
- Prime Minister: Manuel Marrero Cruz

== Events ==
=== January ===
- January 2 – The 60th anniversary of the Cuban Revolution was celebrated in the capital of Havana.
- January 27 – A rare EF4 tornado makes landfall in Havana, killing at least three and causing severe damage.

=== February ===
- February 24 – The 2019 Cuban constitutional referendum took place.

=== March ===
- March 24–27 – President Díaz-Canel hosted the Charles, Prince of Wales and Camilla, Duchess of Cornwall to the capital as the first members of the British royal family to visit the island.

=== April ===
- April 10 – The new Constitution of Cuba came into force.

=== December ===
- December 21 – Manuel Marrero Cruz assumes office as the 19th Prime Minister of Cuba, becoming the first person to hold the office after the post was reestablished by the 2019 Constitution.

== Deaths ==
- January 6 – José Ramón Fernández, vice president of the Council of Ministers (b. 1923)
- January 14 – Bernardo Benes, Jewish civic leader (b. 1934)
- February 20 – Chelo Alonso, actress (b. 1933)
- July 20 – Roberto Fernández Retamar, poet (b. 1930)
- July 26 – Jaime Lucas Ortega y Alamino, cardinal (b. 1936)
- April 21 – Amelia Vargas, actress and dancer (b. 1928)
- August 26 – Isabel Toledo, Cuban-American fashion designer (b. 1960)
- September 9 – Dulce García, Olympic javelin thrower (b. 1968)
- October 17 – Alicia Alonso, ballerina (b. 1920)
- November 20 – Bertha Díaz, Olympic sprinter (b. 1936)
- December 5 – Faure Chomón, politician (b. 1929)
- December 29 – Harry Villegas, communist revolutionary (b. 1940)
