= List of diplomatic missions of Cuba =

This is a list of diplomatic missions of the Republic of Cuba, excluding honorary consulates. Cuba has an extensive global diplomatic presence and is the Latin American country with the second highest number of diplomatic missions after Brazil.

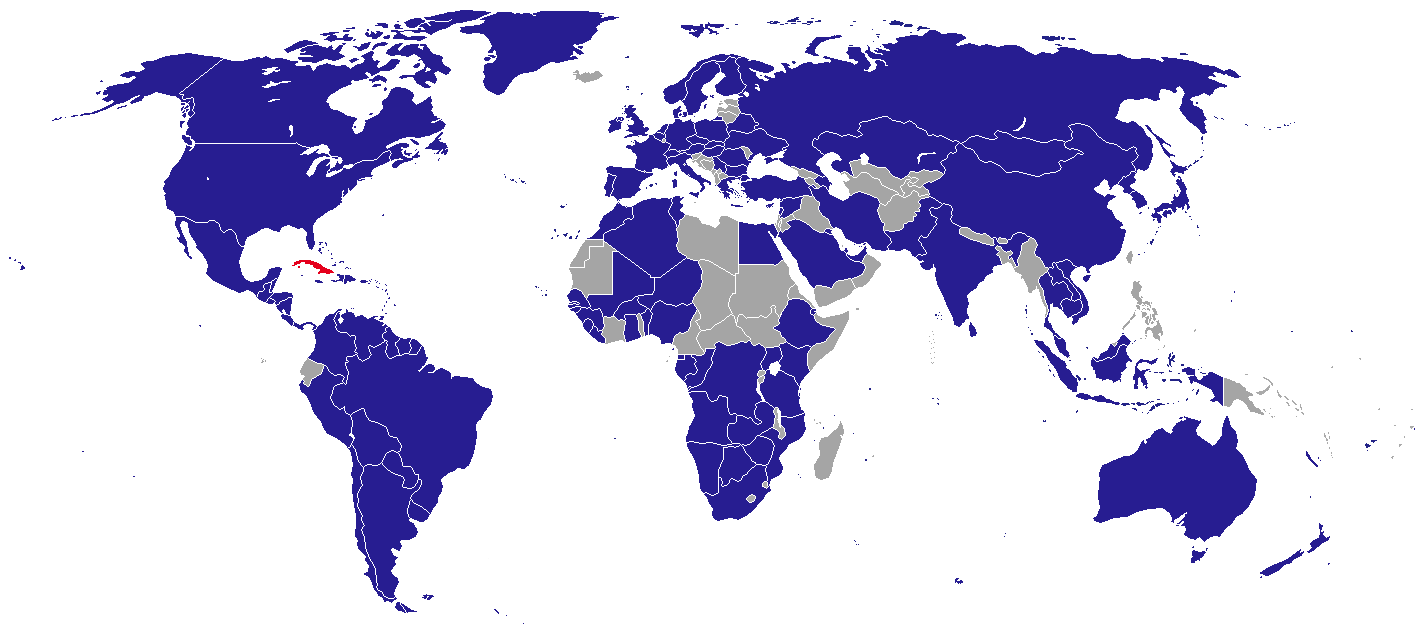
Map of Cuban diplomatic missions

== Current missions ==
=== Africa ===
Host country	Host city	Mission	Concurrent accreditation	Ref.
Algeria	Algiers	Embassy	Countries: Sahrawi Republic	
Angola	Luanda	Embassy	Countries: São Tomé and Príncipe	
Benin	Cotonou	Embassy	Countries: Togo	
Botswana	Gaborone	Embassy	International Organizations: Southern African Development Community (Note: Accredited as an observer mission.)	
Burkina Faso	Ouagadougou	Embassy		
Cape Verde	Praia	Embassy		
Congo-Brazzaville	Brazzaville	Embassy	Countries: Cameroon	
Congo-Kinshasa	Kinshasa	Embassy	Countries: Central African Republic	
Djibouti	Djibouti City	Embassy		
Egypt	Cairo	Embassy	Countries: Palestine; Sudan	
Equatorial Guinea	Malabo	Embassy		
Ethiopia	Addis Ababa	Embassy	Countries: South Sudan; International Organizations: African Union	
Gabon	Libreville	Embassy		
Gambia	Banjul	Embassy		
Ghana	Accra	Embassy		
Guinea	Conakry	Embassy	Countries: Ivory Coast	
Guinea-Bissau	Bissau	Embassy		
Kenya	Nairobi	Embassy	Countries: Madagascar; Somalia; International Organizations: United Nations; United Nations Environment Programme; United Nations Human Settlements Programme	
Liberia	Monrovia	Embassy		
Mali	Bamako	Embassy		
Morocco	Rabat	Embassy		
Mozambique	Maputo	Embassy		
Namibia	Windhoek	Embassy		
Niger	Niamey	Embassy	Countries: Chad	
Nigeria	Abuja	Embassy	International Organizations: Economic Community of West African States	
Senegal	Dakar	Embassy		
Seychelles	Victoria	Embassy		
Sierra Leone	Freetown	Embassy		
South Africa	Pretoria	Embassy	Countries: Eswatini; Lesotho	
Tanzania	Dar Es Salaam	Embassy	Countries: Comoros	
Tunisia	Tunis	Embassy	Countries: Libya	
Uganda	Kampala	Embassy	Countries: Burundi; Rwanda	
Zambia	Lusaka	Embassy	Countries: Malawi	
Zimbabwe	Harare	Embassy	Countries: Mauritius	

=== Americas ===
Host country	Host city	Mission	Concurrent accreditation	Ref.
Antigua and Barbuda	St. John's	Embassy		
Argentina	Buenos Aires	Embassy		
Bahamas	Nassau	Embassy		
Barbados	Bridgetown	Embassy		
Belize	Belize City	Embassy		
Bolivia	La Paz	Embassy		
Bolivia	Santa Cruz de la Sierra	Consulate-General		
Brazil	Brasília	Embassy		
Brazil	São Paulo	Consulate-General		
Canada	Ottawa	Embassy		
Canada	Montreal	Consulate-General		
Canada	Toronto	Consulate-General		
Chile	Santiago de Chile	Embassy		
Colombia	Bogotá	Embassy		
Dominica	Roseau	Embassy		
Dominican Republic	Santo Domingo	Embassy		
El Salvador	San Salvador	Embassy		
Grenada	St. George's	Embassy		
Guatemala	Guatemala City	Embassy		
Guyana	Georgetown	Embassy		
Haiti	Port-au-Prince	Embassy		
Honduras	Tegucigalpa	Embassy		
Jamaica	Kingston	Embassy	International Organizations: International Seabed Authority	
Mexico	Mexico City	Embassy		
Mexico	Cancún	Consulate-General		
Mexico	Mérida	Consulate-General		
Mexico	Monterrey	Consulate-General		
Mexico	Veracruz City	Consulate-General		
Nicaragua	Managua	Embassy		
Panama	Panama City	Embassy		
Paraguay	Asunción	Embassy		
Peru	Lima	Embassy		
Saint Kitts and Nevis	Basseterre	Embassy		
Saint Lucia	Gros Islet	Embassy	International Organizations: Organisation of Eastern Caribbean States	
Saint Vincent and the Grenadines	Kingstown	Embassy		
Suriname	Paramaribo	Embassy		
Trinidad and Tobago	Port of Spain	Embassy		
United States	Washington, D.C.	Embassy		
United States	Washington, D.C.	Consular Office		
Uruguay	Montevideo	Embassy	International Organizations: ALADI	
Venezuela	Caracas	Embassy		
Venezuela	Valencia	Consulate-General		

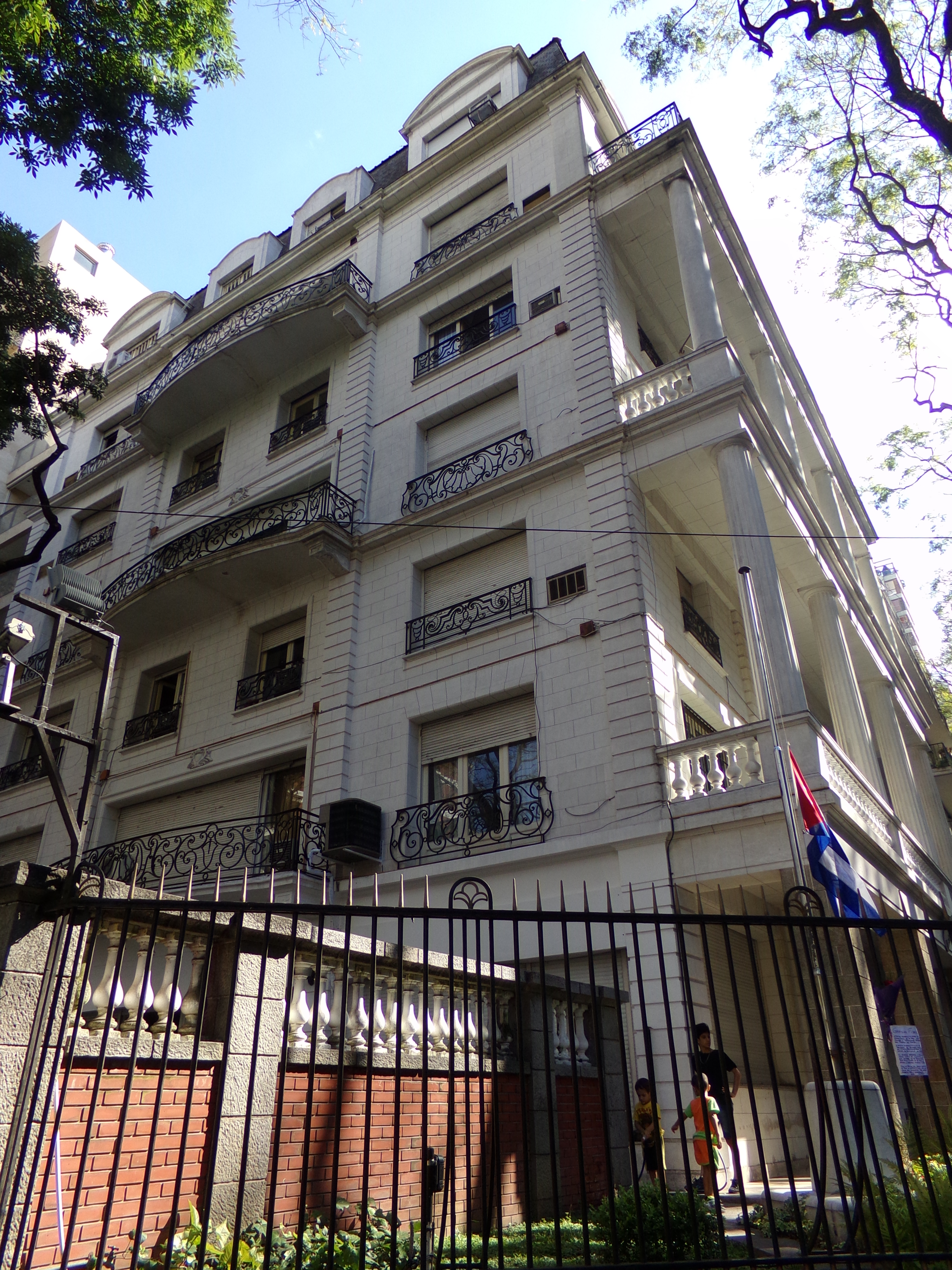
Embassy in Buenos Aires

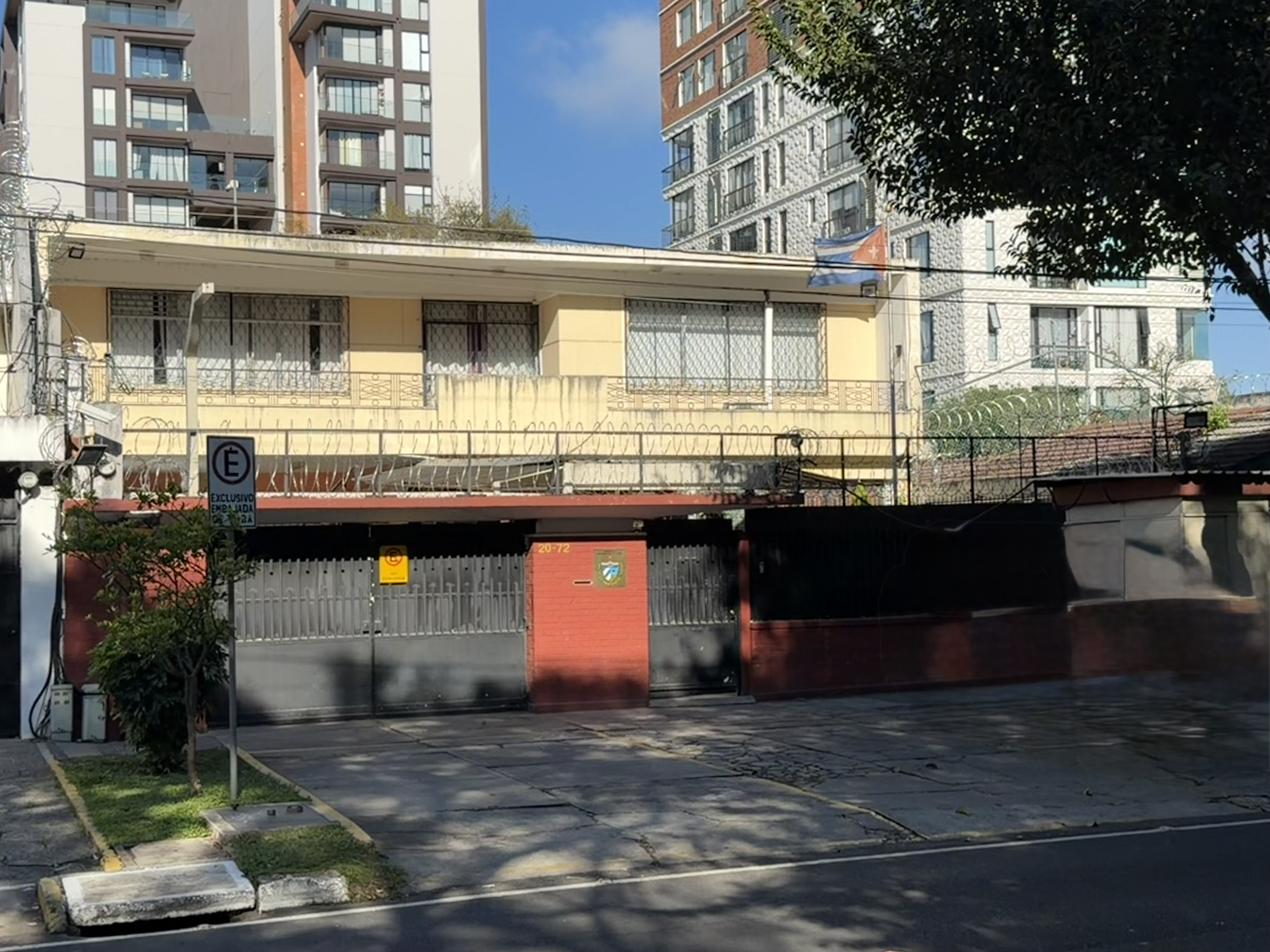
Embassy in Guatemala City

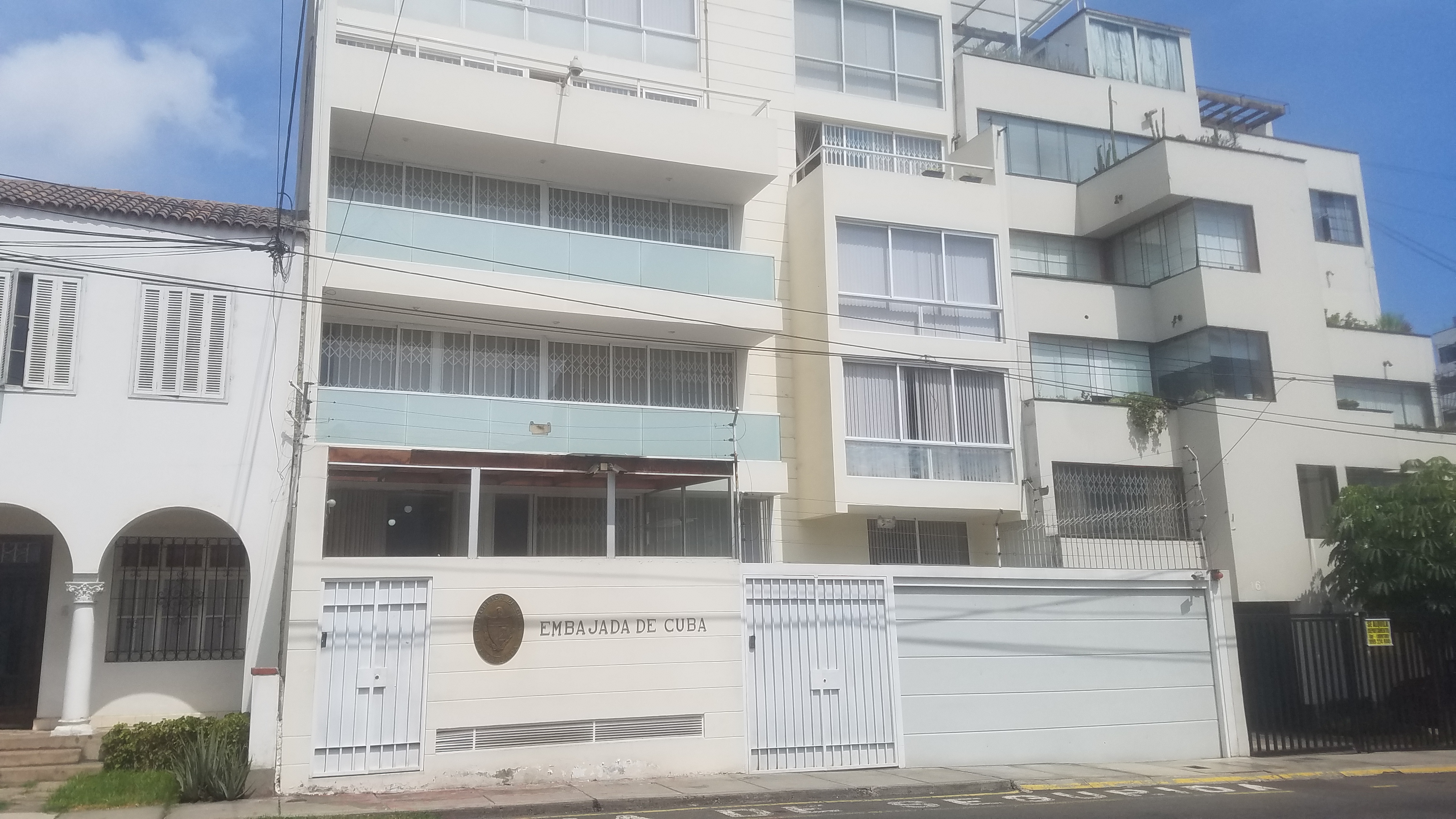
Embassy in Lima

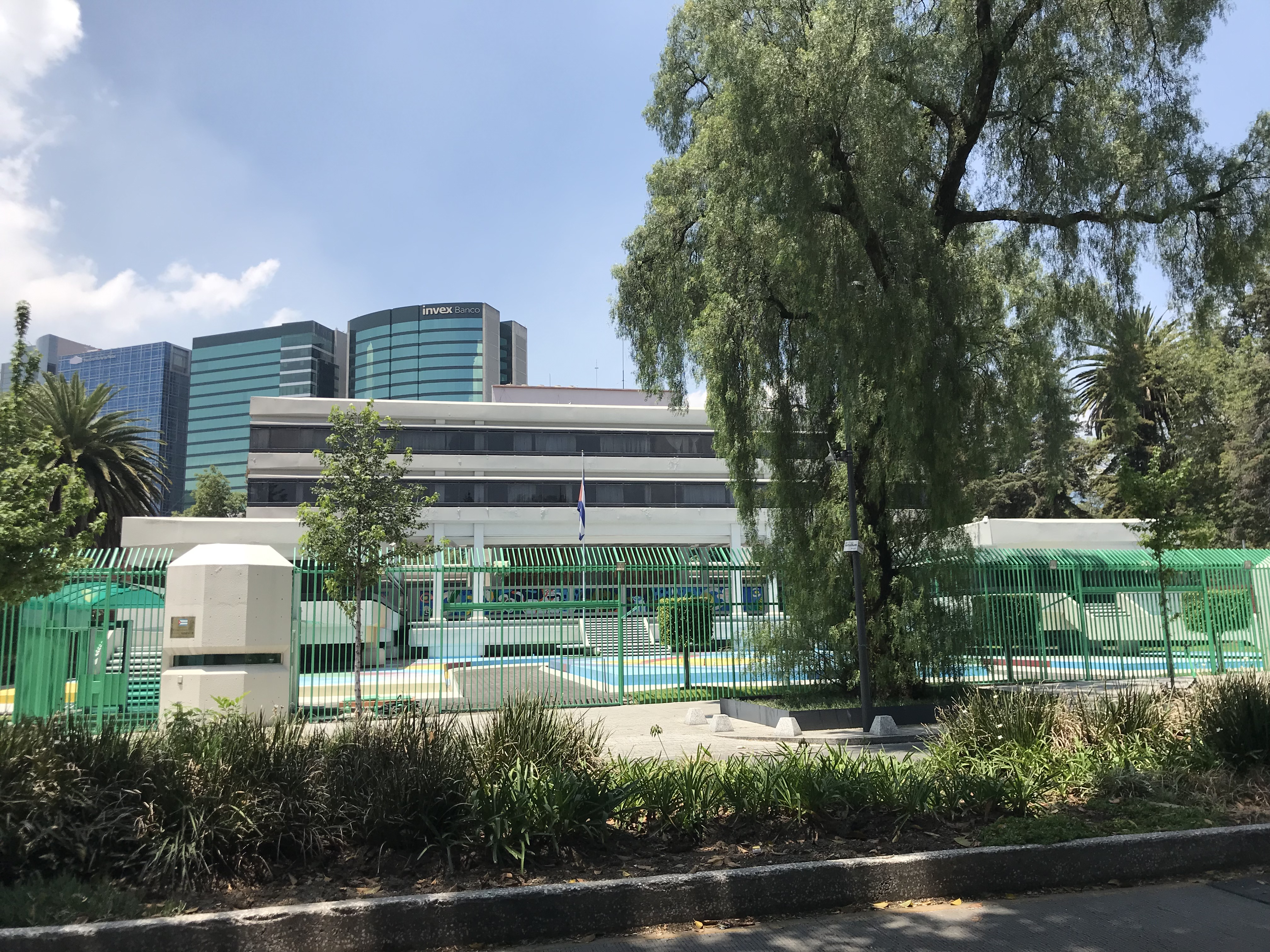
Embassy in Mexico City

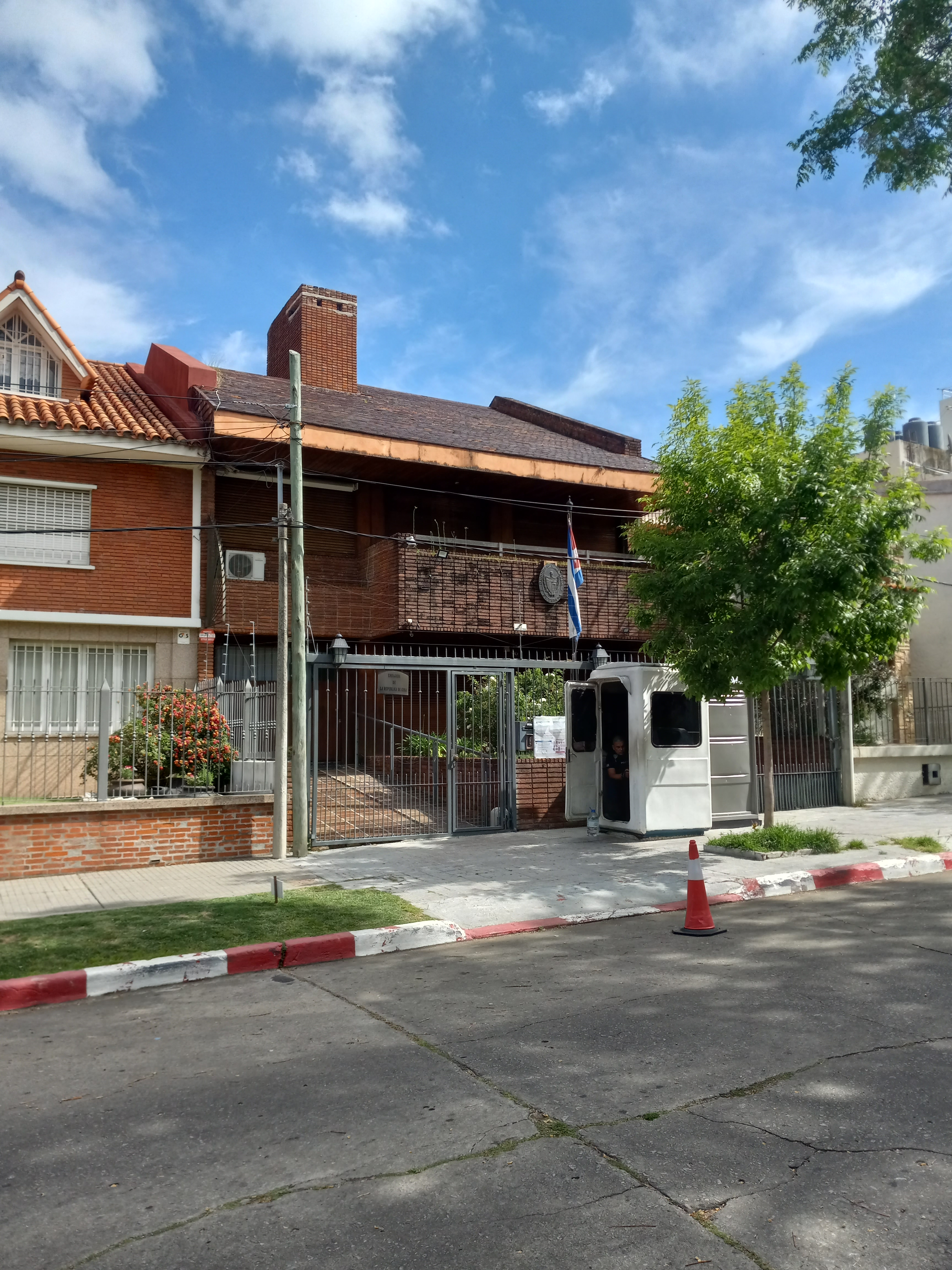
Embassy in Montevideo

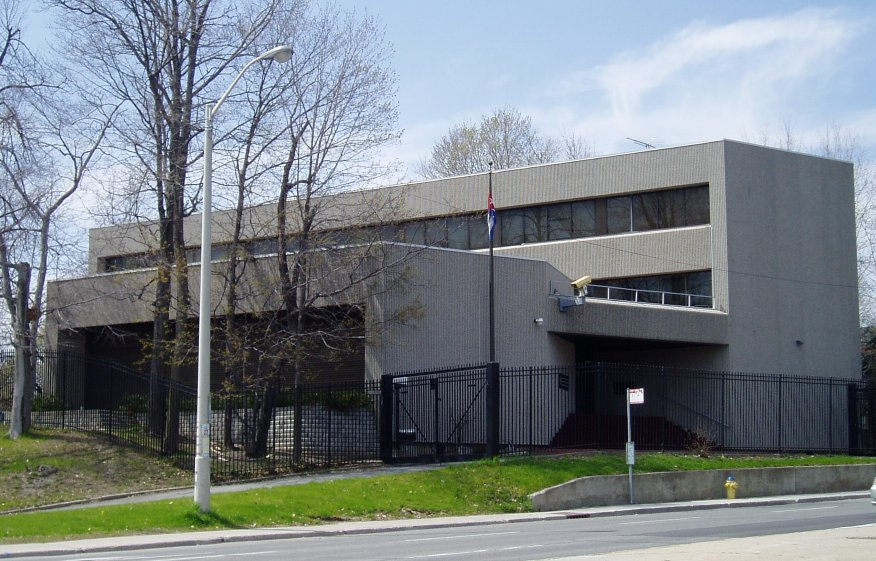
Embassy in Ottawa

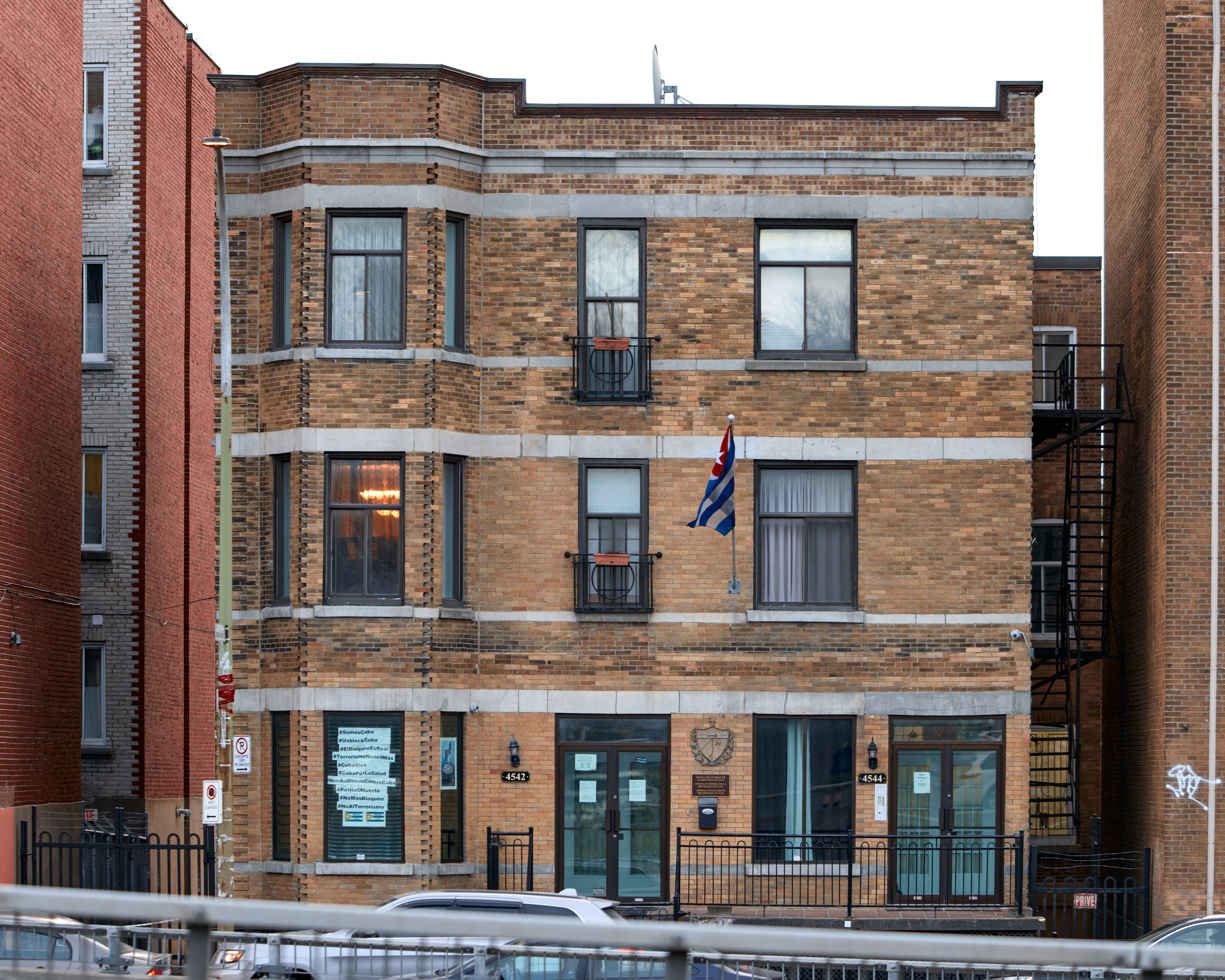
Consulate-General in Montreal

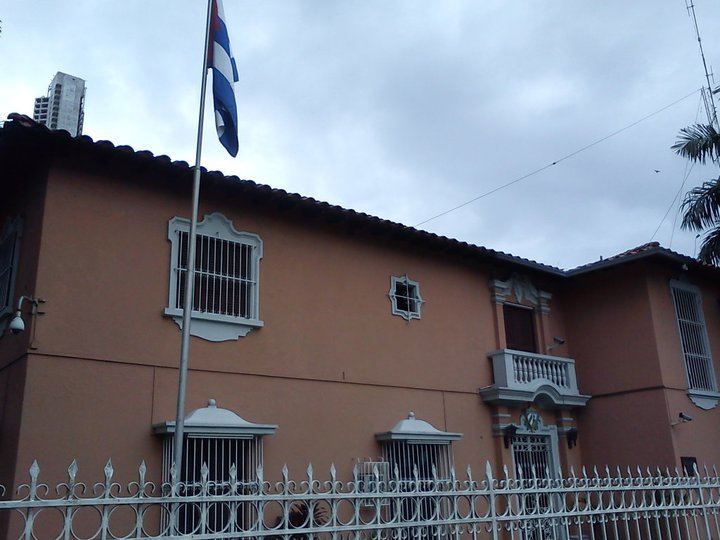
Embassy in Panama City

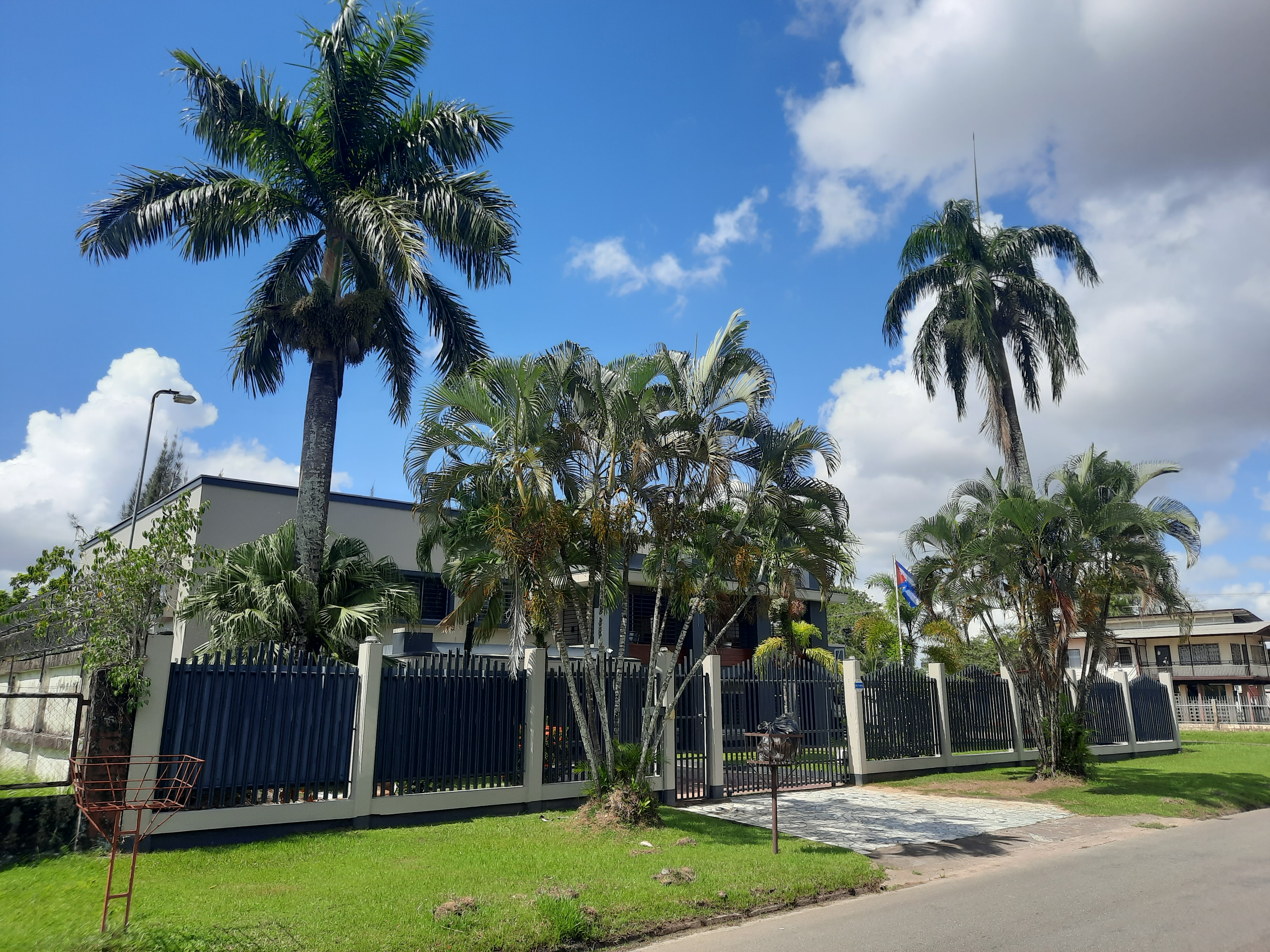
Embassy in Paramaribo

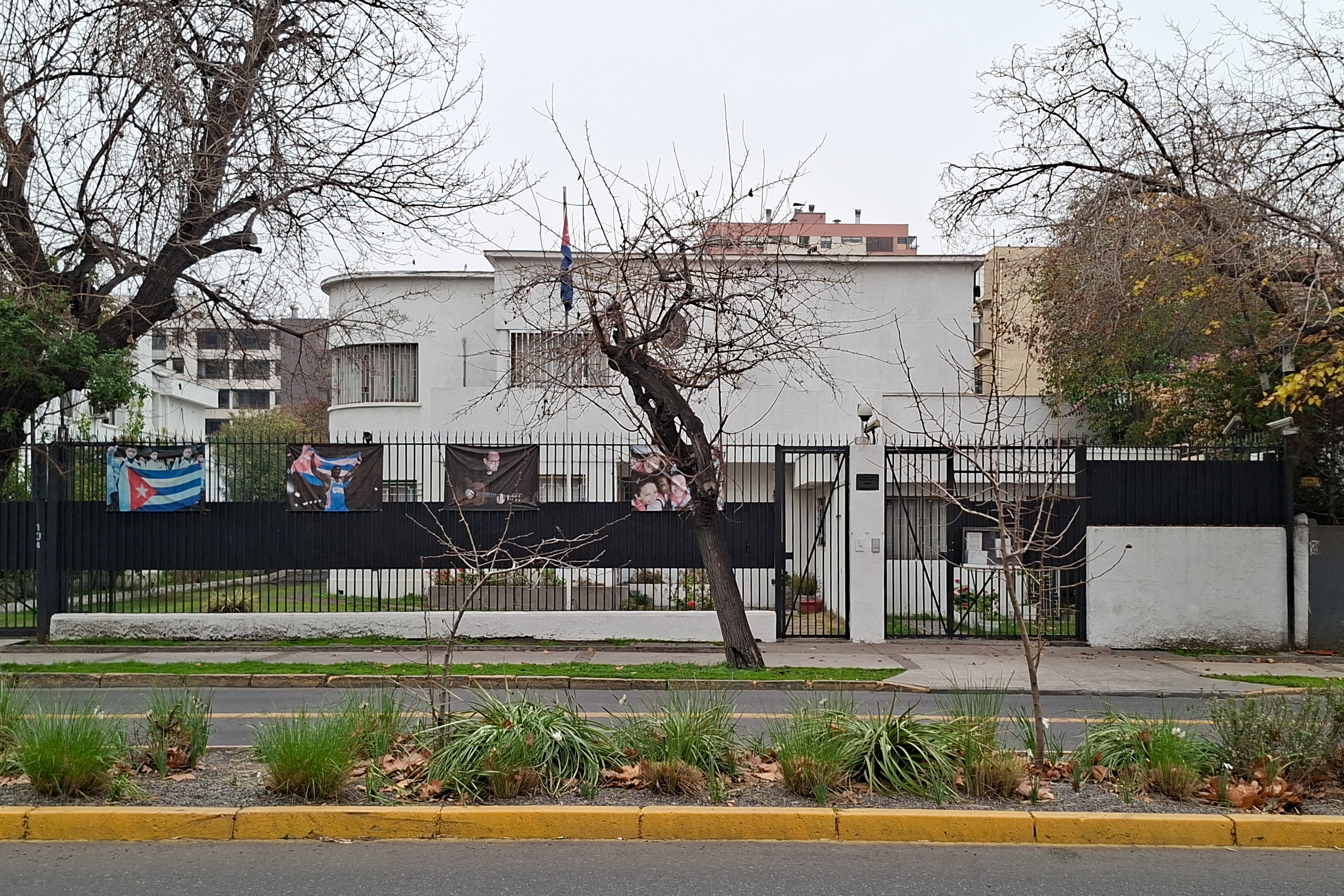
Embassy in Santiago

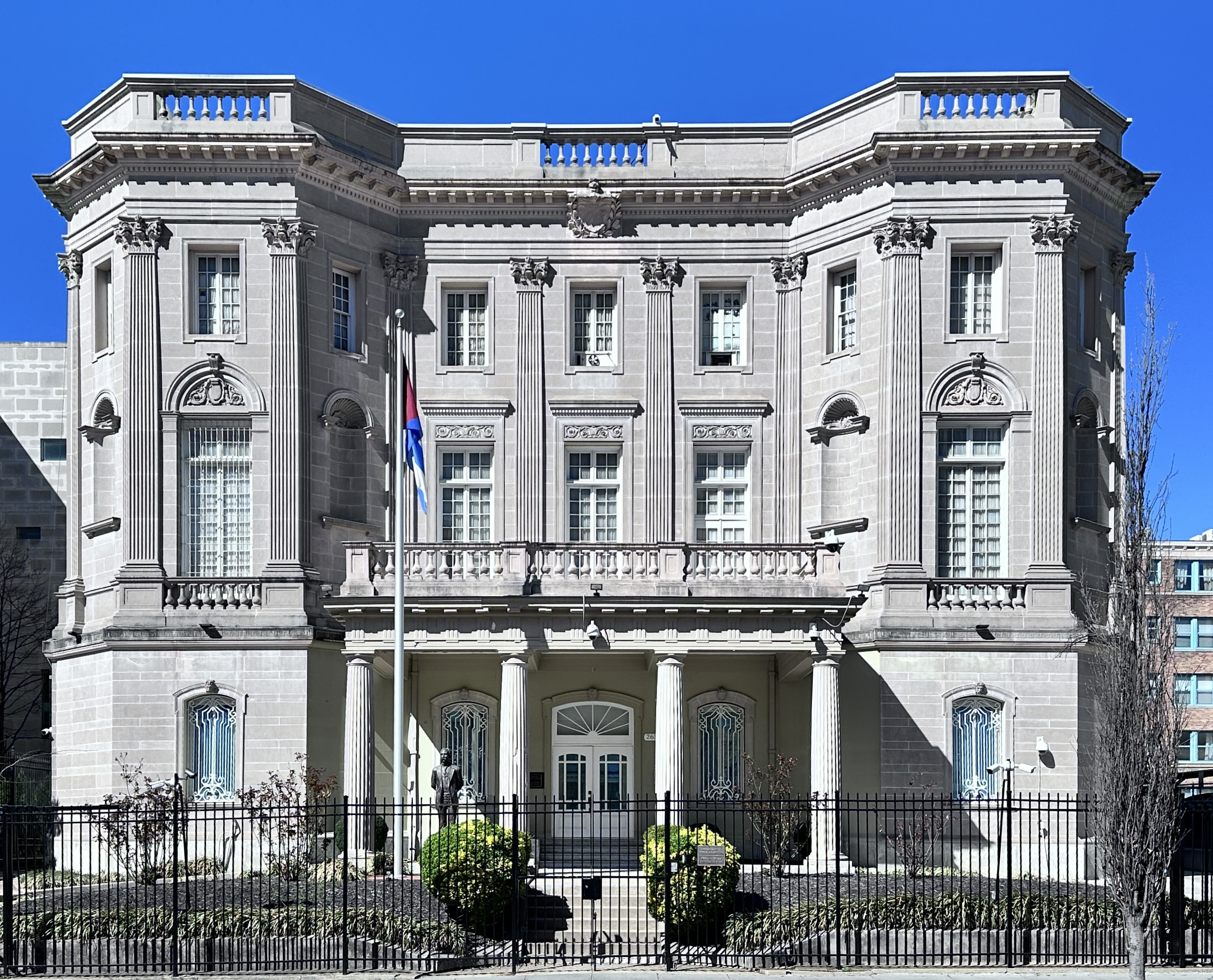
Embassy in Washington, D.C.

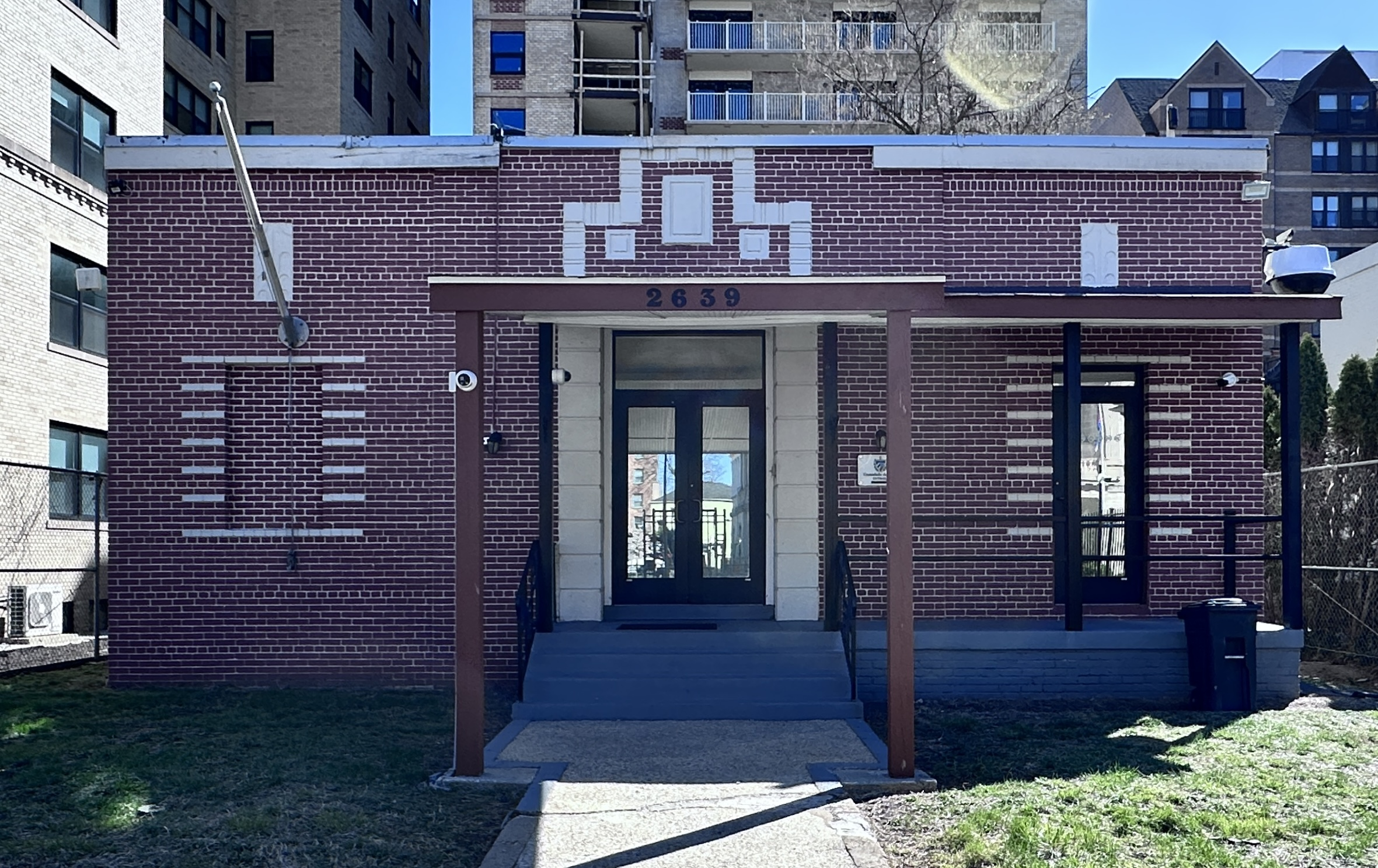
Consular office in Washington, D.C.

=== Asia ===
Host country	Host city	Mission	Concurrent accreditation	Ref.
Azerbaijan	Baku	Embassy	Countries: Georgia; Turkmenistan; Uzbekistan	
Cambodia	Phnom Penh	Embassy		
China	Beijing	Embassy		
China	Guangzhou	Consulate-General		
China	Shanghai	Consulate-General		
India	New Delhi	Embassy	Countries: Bangladesh; Bhutan; Nepal	
Indonesia	Jakarta	Embassy	International Organizations: Association of Southeast Asian Nations	
Iran	Tehran	Embassy	Countries: Iraq	
Japan	Tokyo	Embassy		
Kazakhstan	Astana	Embassy	Countries: Armenia; Kyrgyzstan; Tajikistan	
Kuwait	Kuwait City	Embassy		
Laos	Vientiane	Embassy		
Lebanon	Beirut	Embassy		
Malaysia	Kuala Lumpur	Embassy	Countries: Brunei; Philippines	
Mongolia	Ulaanbaatar	Embassy		
North Korea	Pyongyang	Embassy		
Pakistan	Islamabad	Embassy		
Qatar	Doha	Embassy		
Saudi Arabia	Riyadh	Embassy	Countries: Bahrain; Oman; Yemen	
Singapore	Singapore	Embassy		
South Korea	Seoul	Embassy		
Sri Lanka	Colombo	Embassy	Countries: Maldives	
Syria	Damascus	Embassy	Countries: Jordan	
Thailand	Bangkok	Embassy	Countries: Myanmar	
Timor-Leste	Dili	Embassy		
Turkey	Ankara	Embassy		
Turkey	Istanbul	Consulate-General		
United Arab Emirates	Abu Dhabi	Embassy		
Vietnam	Hanoi	Embassy		
Vietnam	Ho Chi Minh City	Consulate-General		

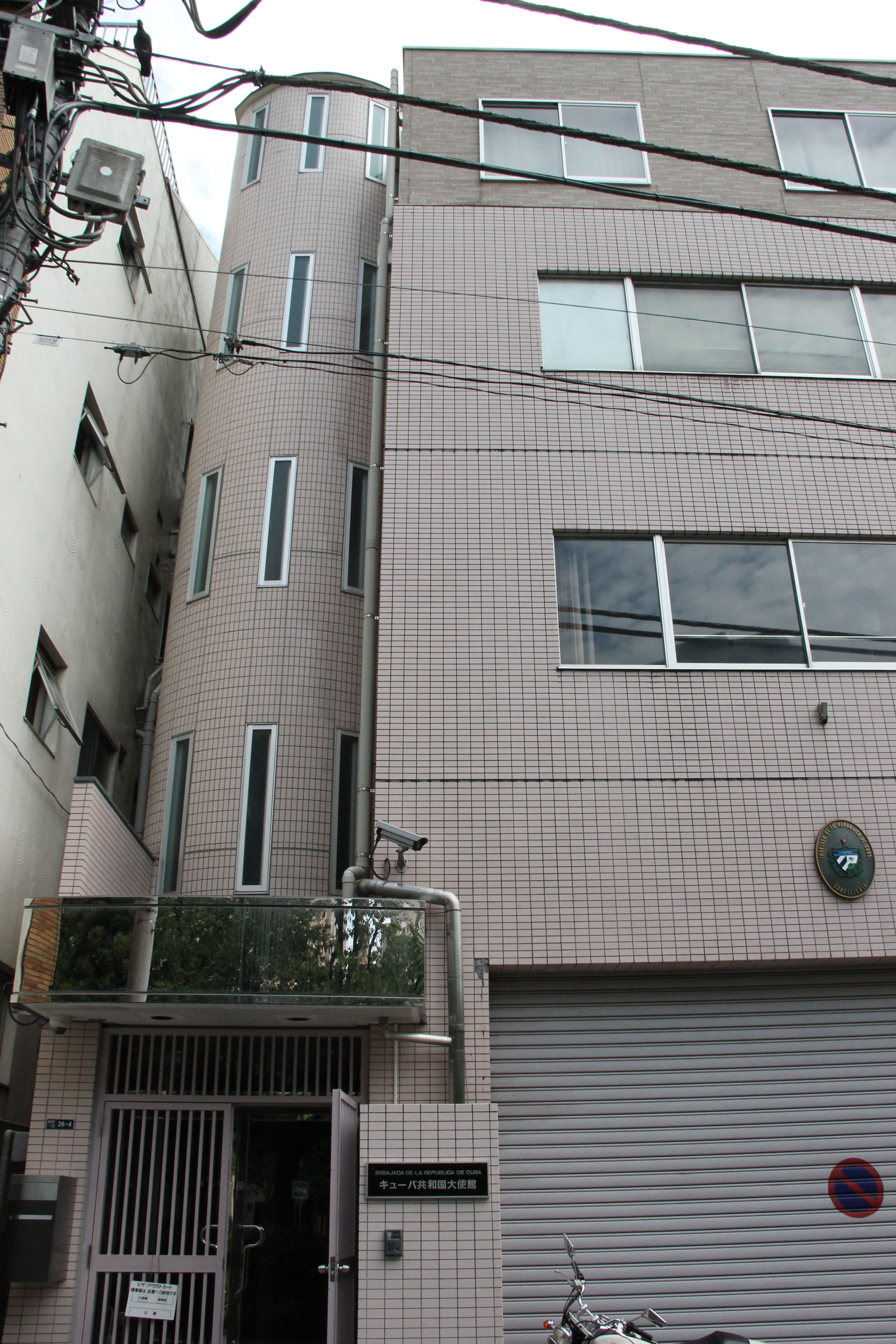
Embassy in Tokyo

=== Europe ===
Host country	Host city	Mission	Concurrent accreditation	Ref.
Austria	Vienna	Embassy	Countries: Croatia; Slovenia; International Organizations: United Nations; International Atomic Energy Agency; UNIDO	
Belarus	Minsk	Embassy		
Belgium	Brussels	Embassy	International Organizations: European Union	
Bulgaria	Sofia	Embassy	Countries: Albania; North Macedonia	
Cyprus	Nicosia	Embassy		
Czech Republic	Prague	Embassy		
Denmark	Copenhagen	Embassy		
Finland	Helsinki	Embassy	Countries: Estonia; Latvia; Lithuania	
France	Paris	Embassy	Countries: Monaco	
Germany	Berlin	Embassy		
Germany	Bonn	Diplomatic office		
Greece	Athens	Embassy		
Holy See (Note: The Cuban Embassy to the Holy See is located outside Vatican territory in Rome.)	Rome	Embassy	Sovereign entity: Sovereign Military Order of Malta	
Hungary	Budapest	Embassy	Countries: Bosnia and Herzegovina	
Ireland	Dublin	Embassy		
Italy	Rome	Embassy	Countries: Malta; San Marino; International Organizations: Food and Agriculture Organization; International Fund for Agricultural Development; World Food Programme	
Italy	Milan	Consulate-General	Countries: Malta; San Marino; International Organizations: Food and Agriculture Organization; International Fund for Agricultural Development; World Food Programme	
Netherlands	The Hague	Embassy	Countries: Luxembourg; International Organizations: OPCW	
Netherlands	Rotterdam	Consulate-General	Countries: Luxembourg; International Organizations: OPCW	
Norway	Oslo	Embassy		
Poland	Warsaw	Embassy		
Portugal	Lisbon	Embassy		
Romania	Bucharest	Embassy	Countries: Moldova	
Russia	Moscow	Embassy		
Serbia	Belgrade	Embassy	Countries: Montenegro	
Slovakia	Bratislava	Embassy		
Spain	Madrid	Embassy	Countries: Andorra	
Spain	Barcelona	Consulate-General	Countries: Andorra	
Spain	Las Palmas de Gran Canaria	Consulate-General	Countries: Andorra	
Spain	Santiago de Compostela	Consulate-General	Countries: Andorra	
Spain	Seville	Consulate-General	Countries: Andorra	
Sweden	Stockholm	Embassy	Countries: Iceland	
Switzerland	Bern	Embassy	Countries: Liechtenstein	
Ukraine	Kyiv	Embassy		
United Kingdom	London	Embassy	International Organizations: International Maritime Organization	

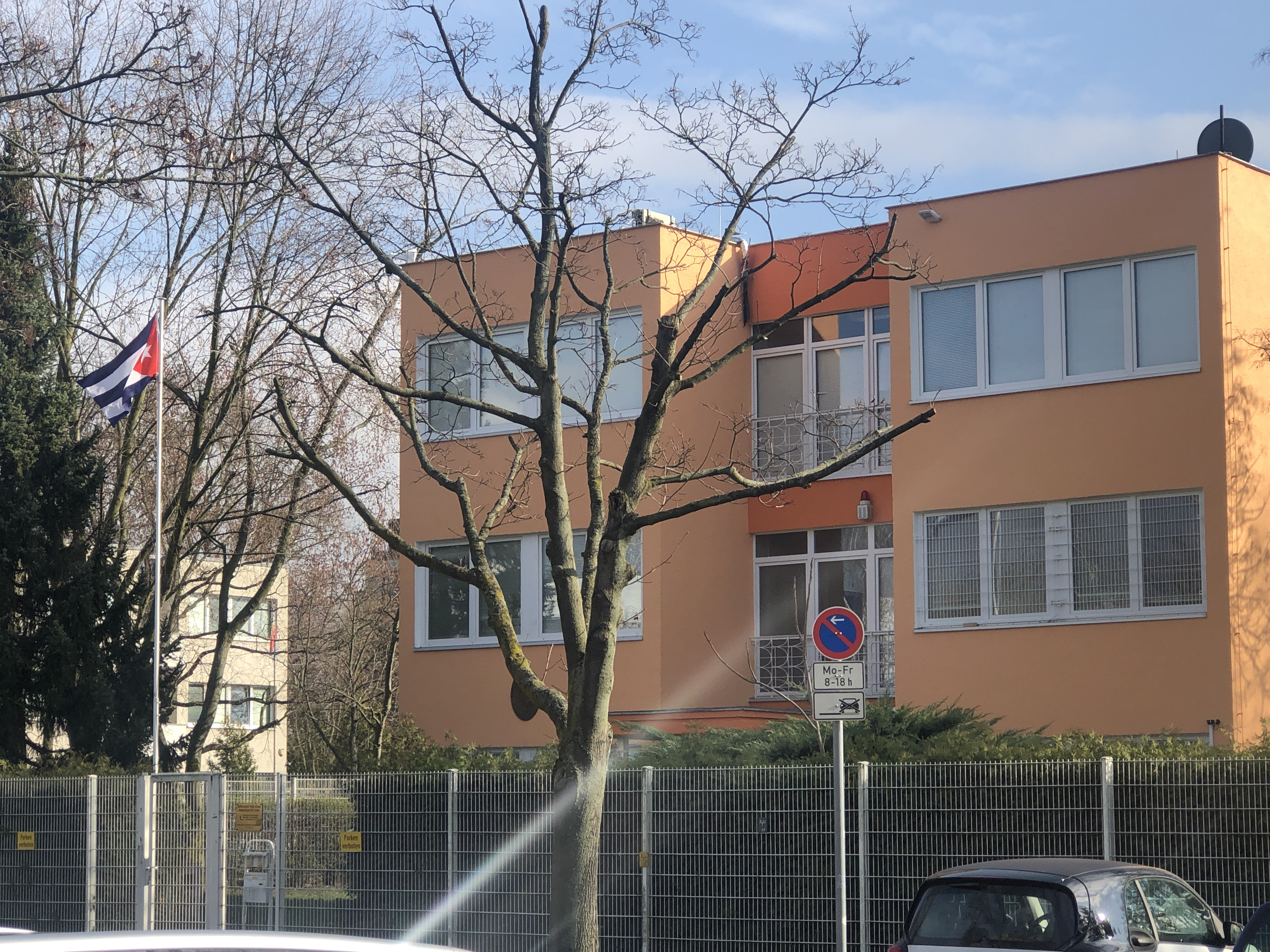
Embassy in Berlin

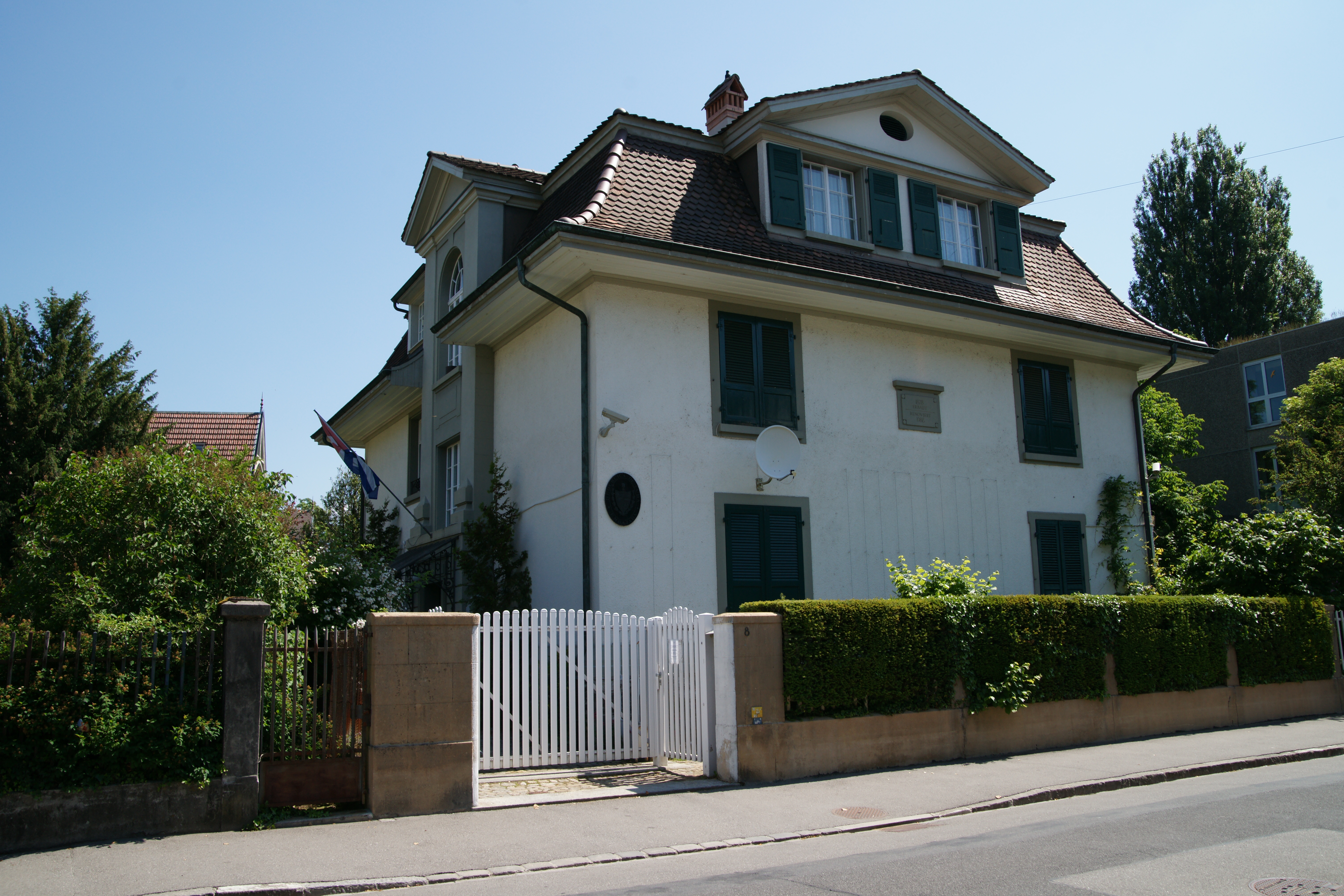
Embassy in Bern

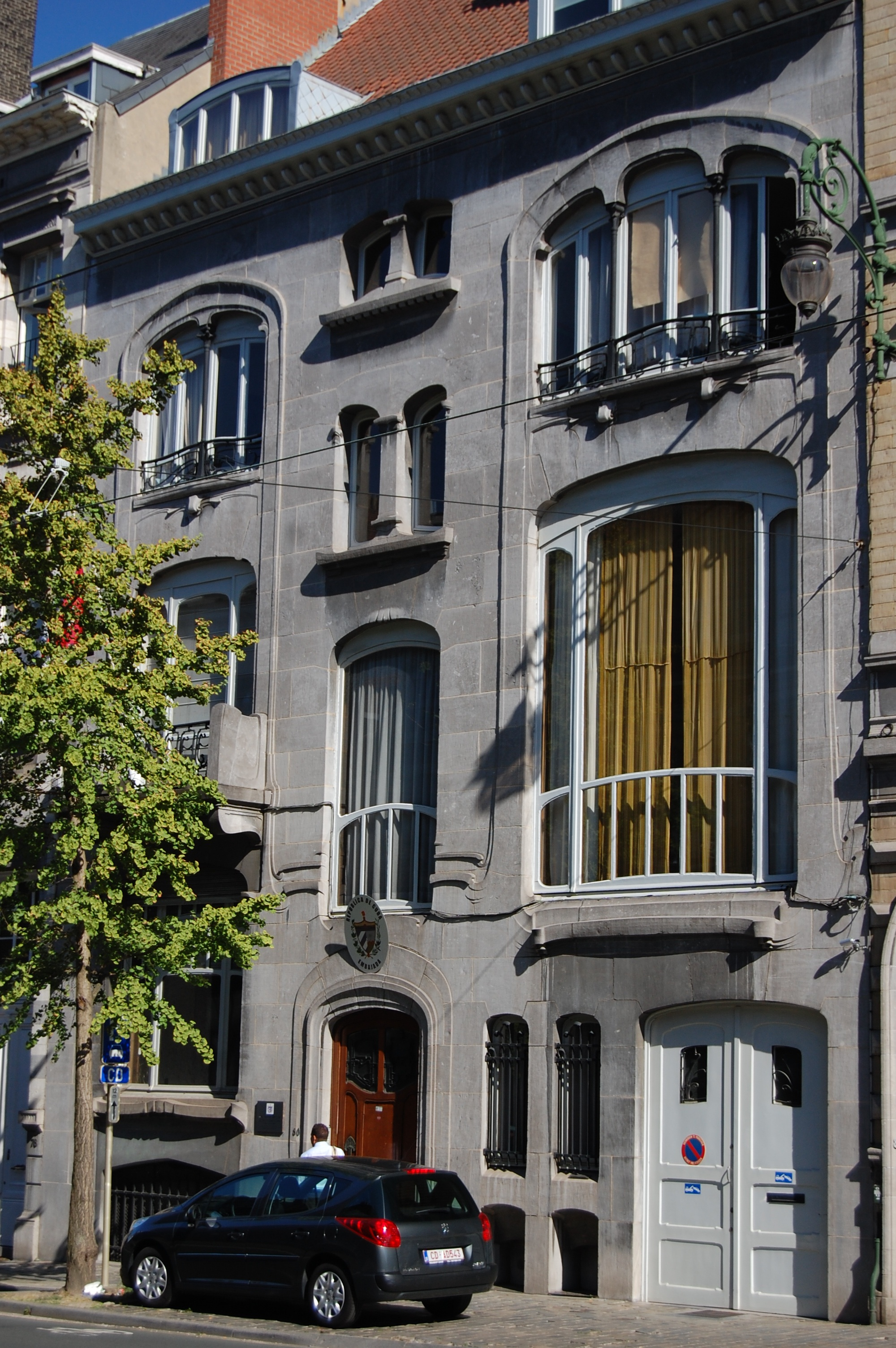
Embassy in Brussels

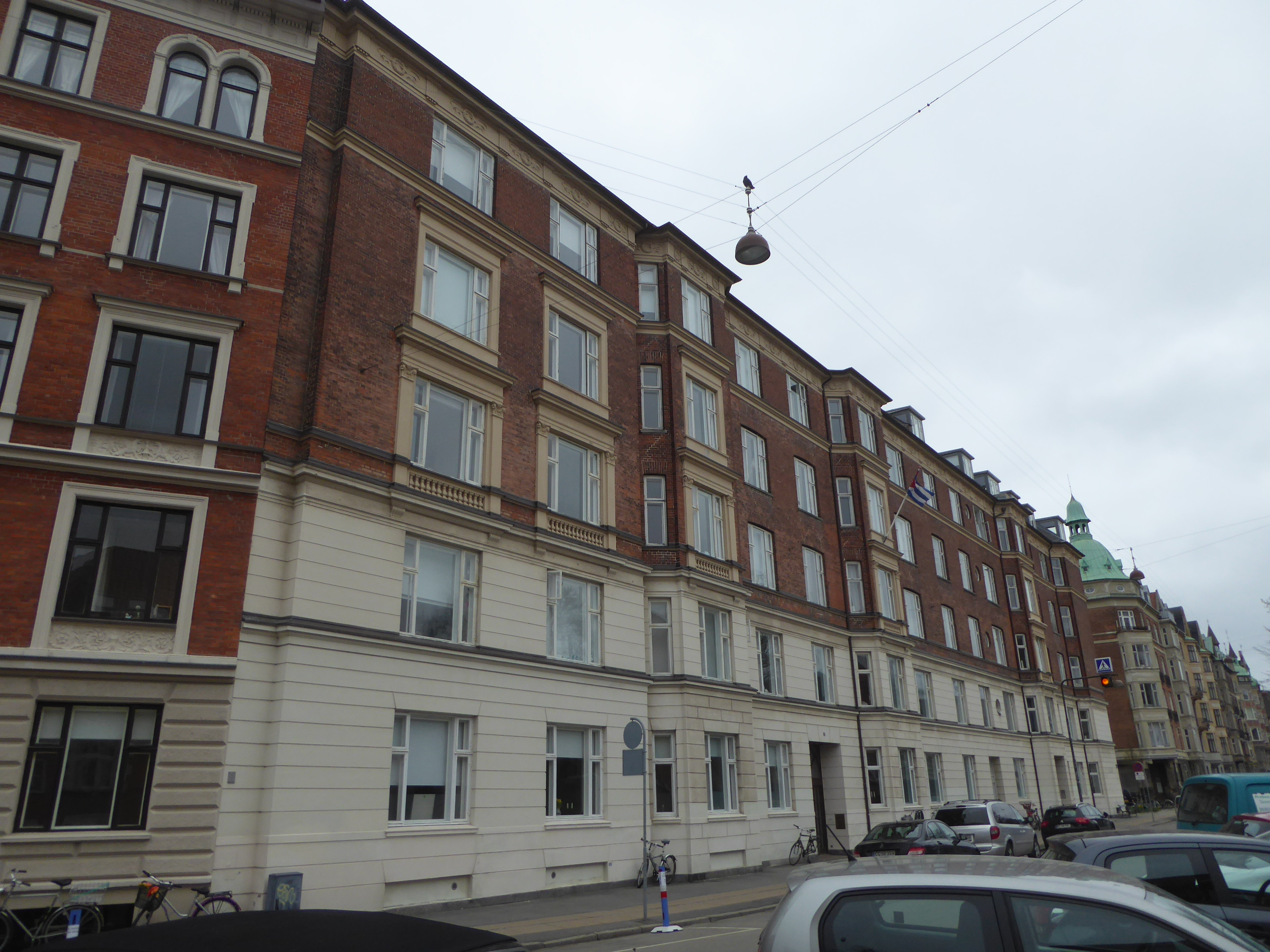
Embassy in Copenhagen

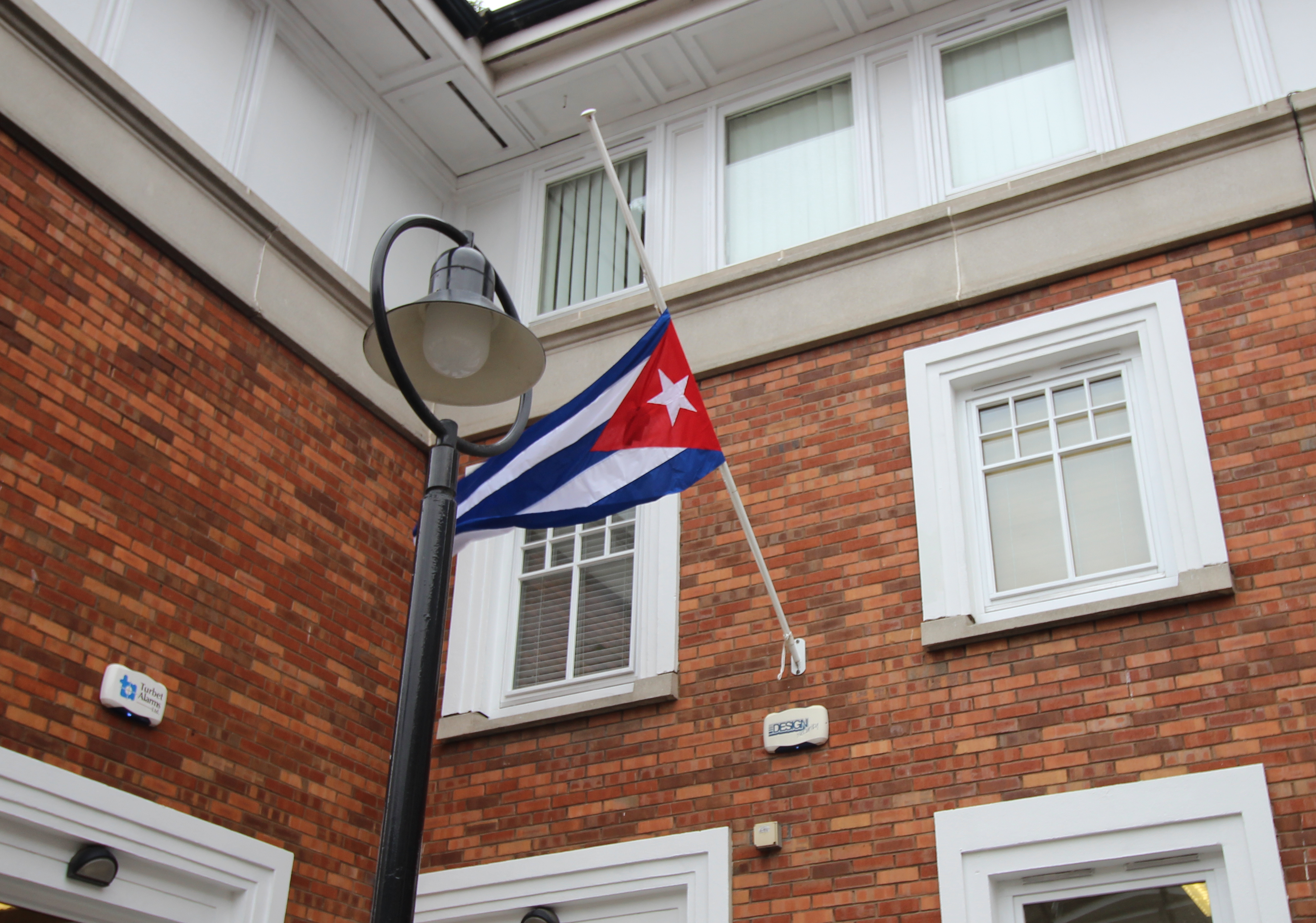
Embassy in Dublin

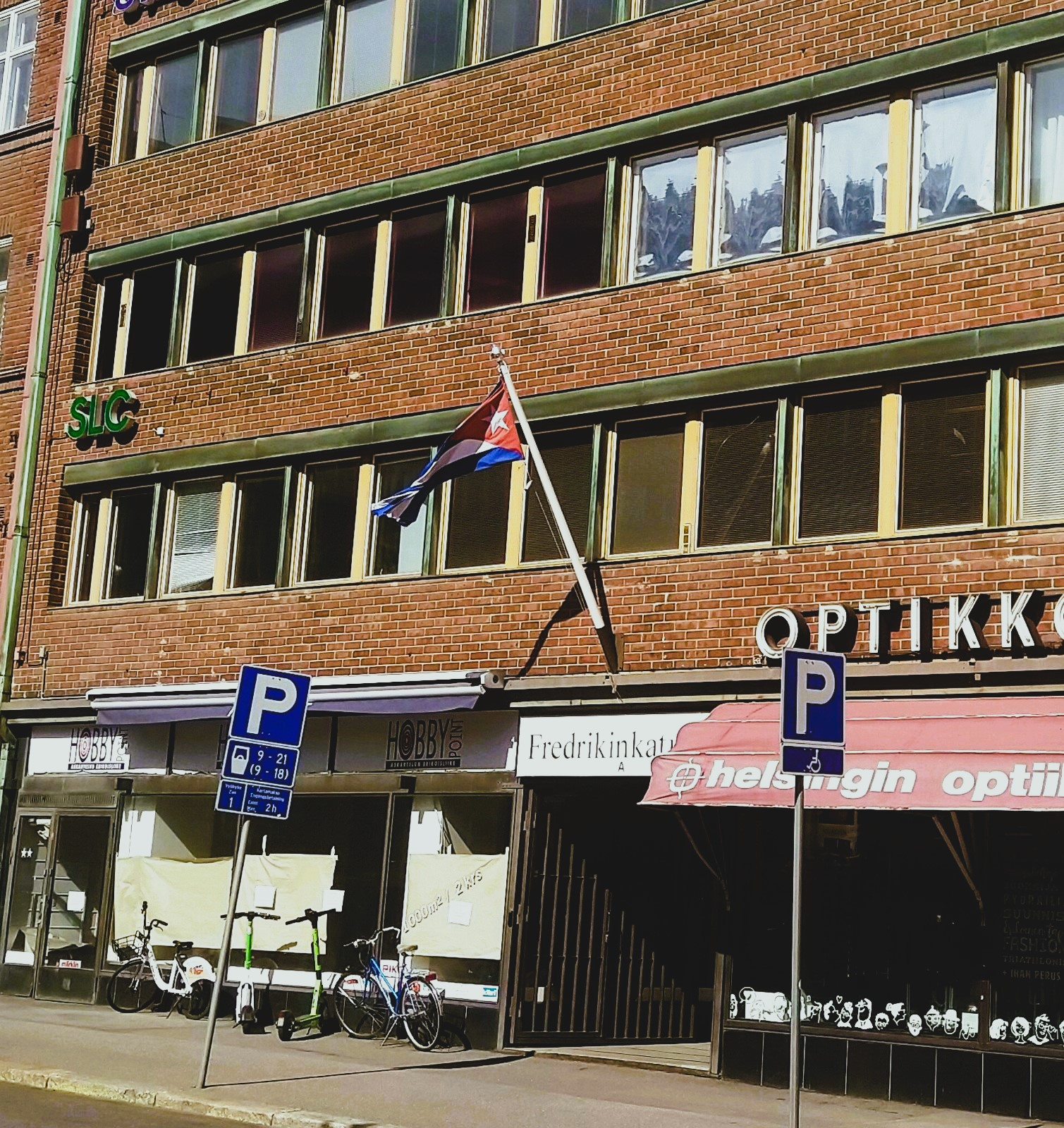
Embassy in Helsinki

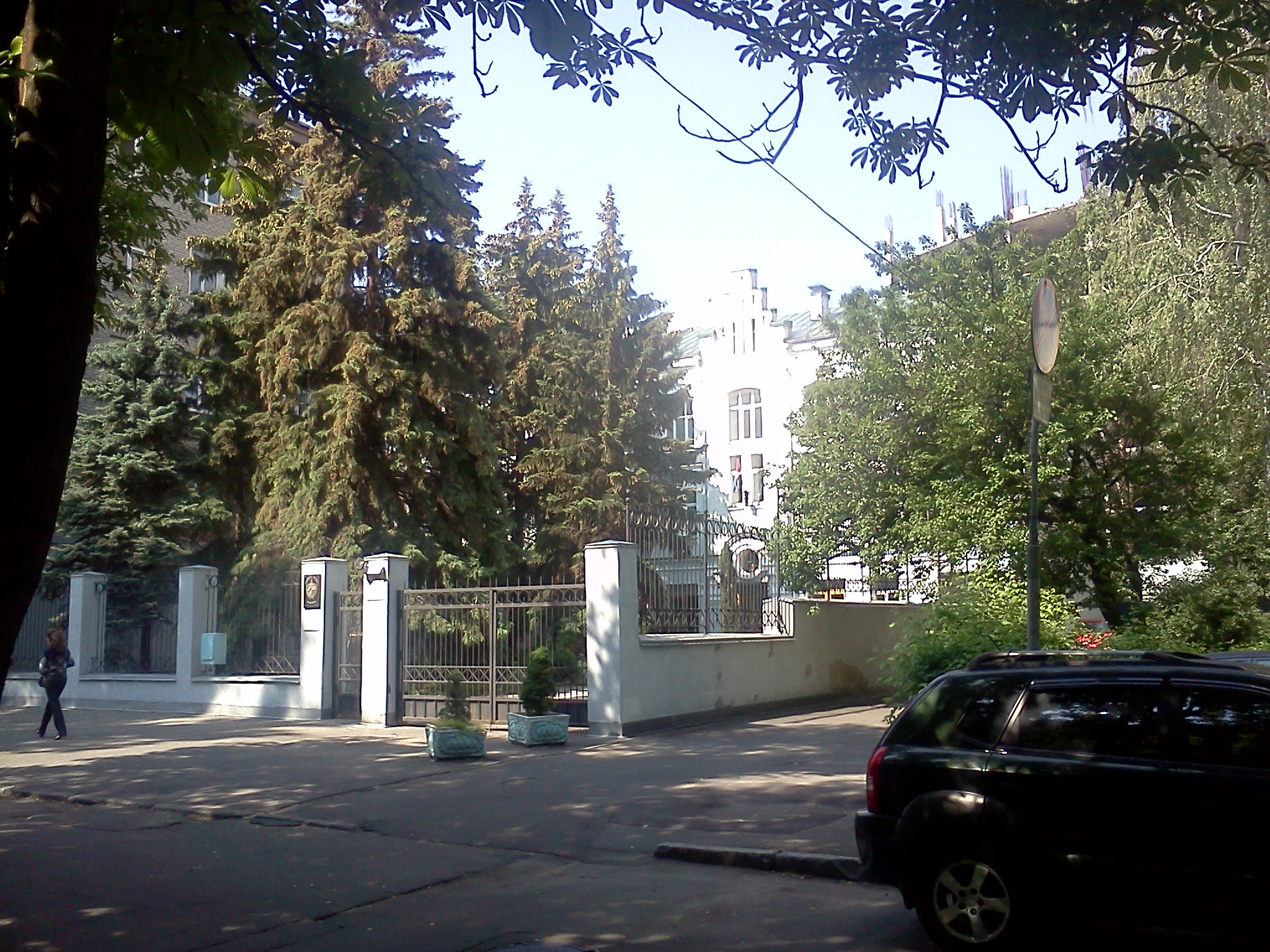
Embassy in Kyiv

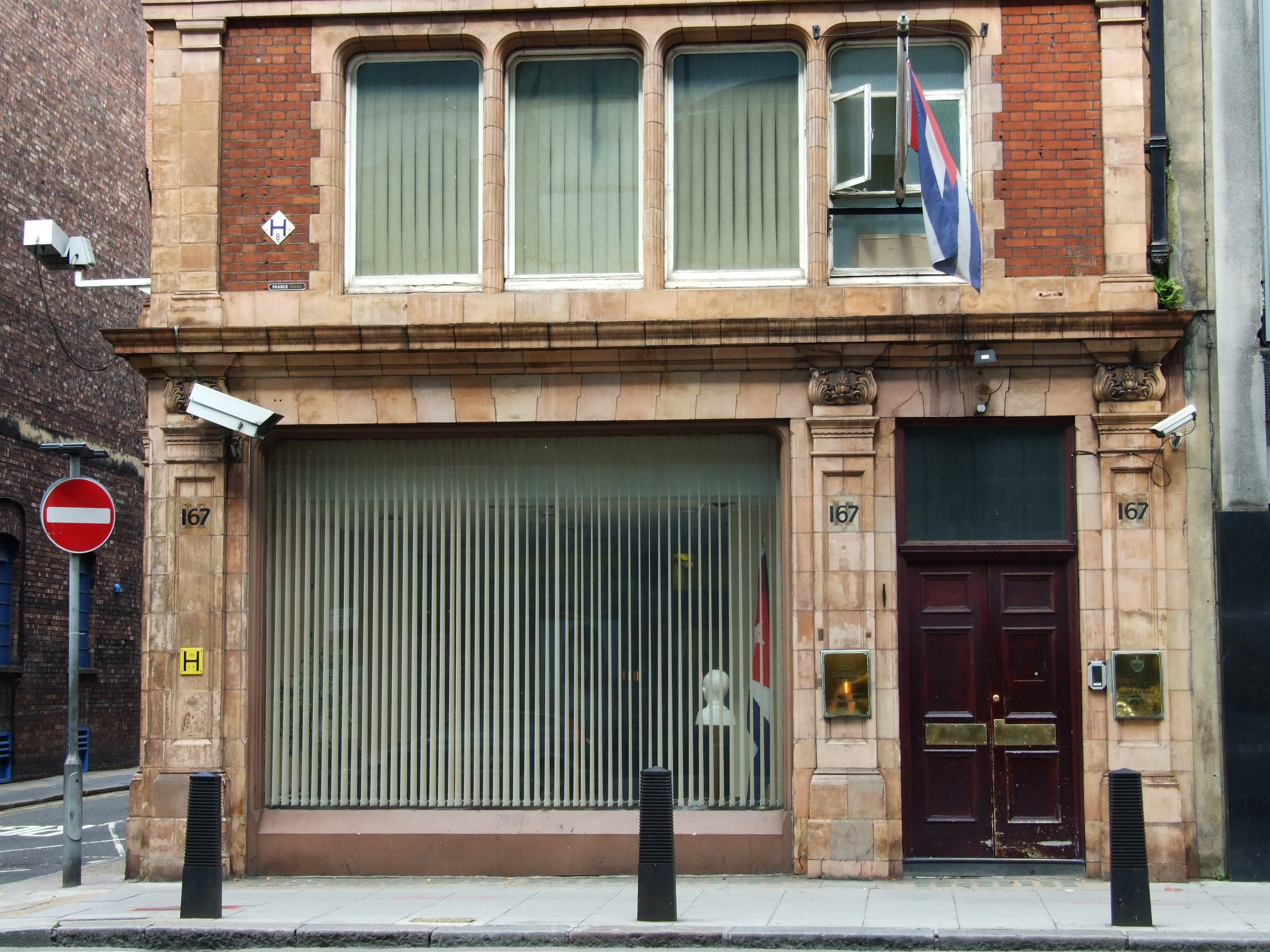
Embassy in London

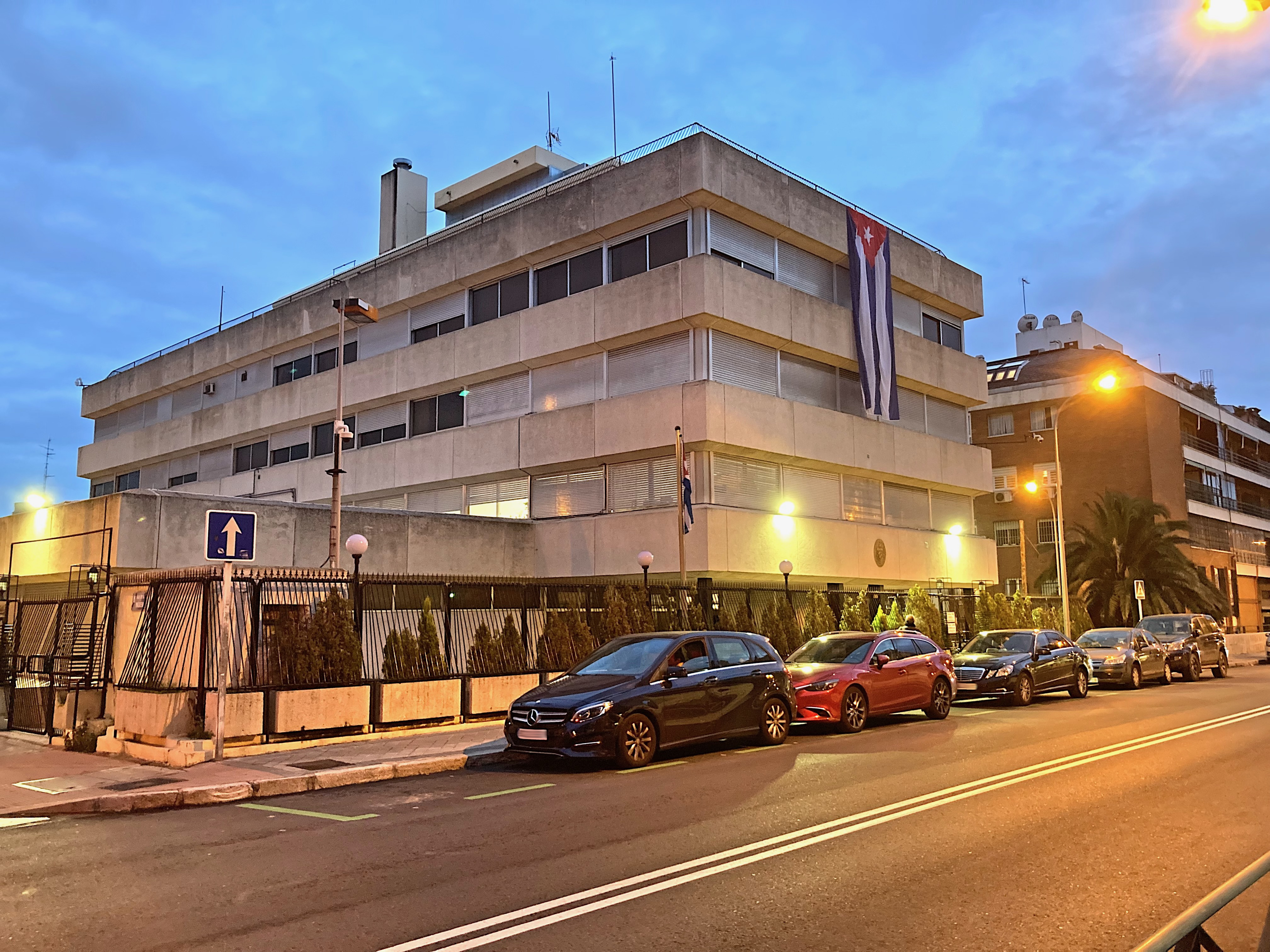
Embassy in Madrid

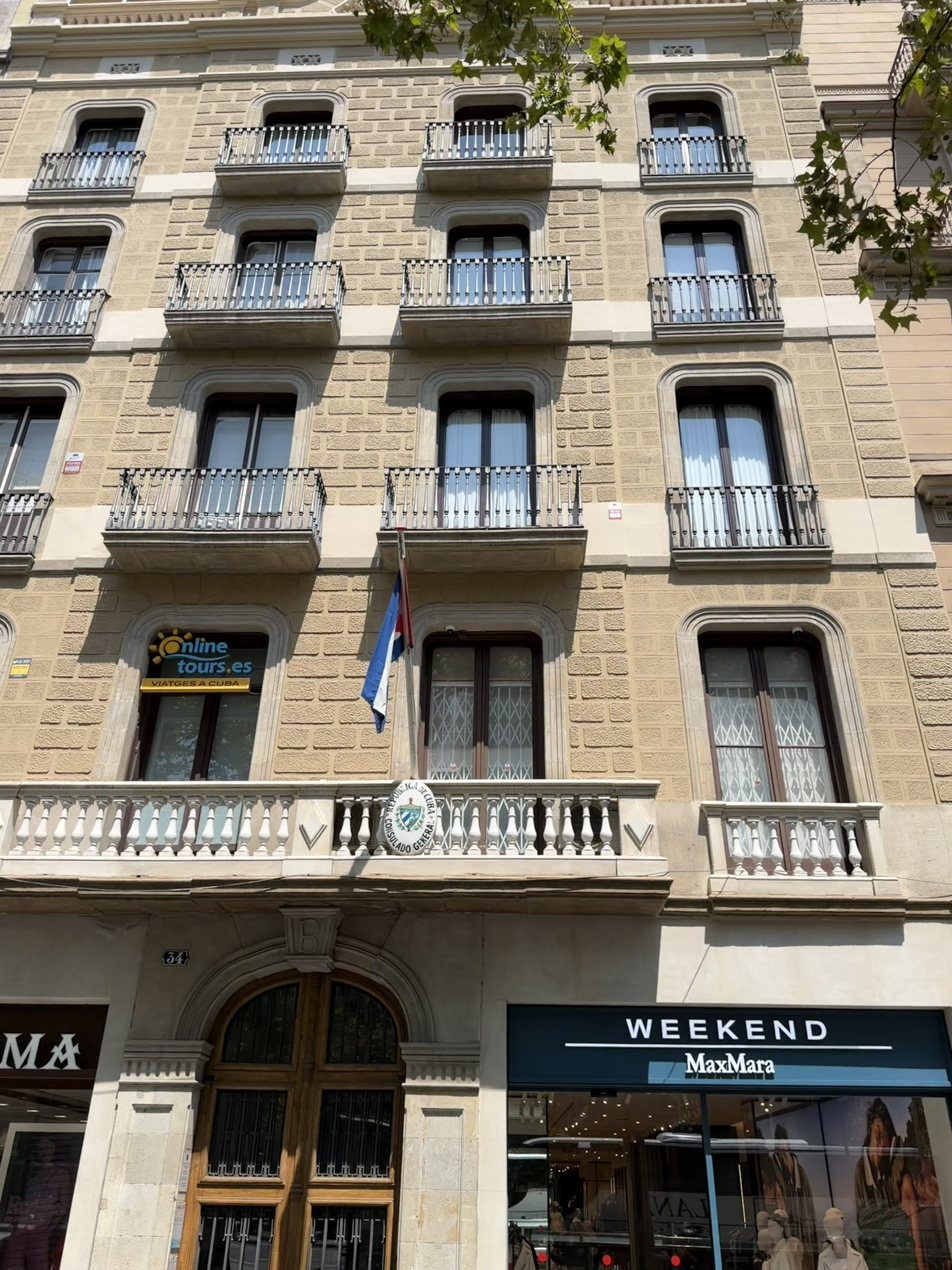
Consulate-General in Barcelona

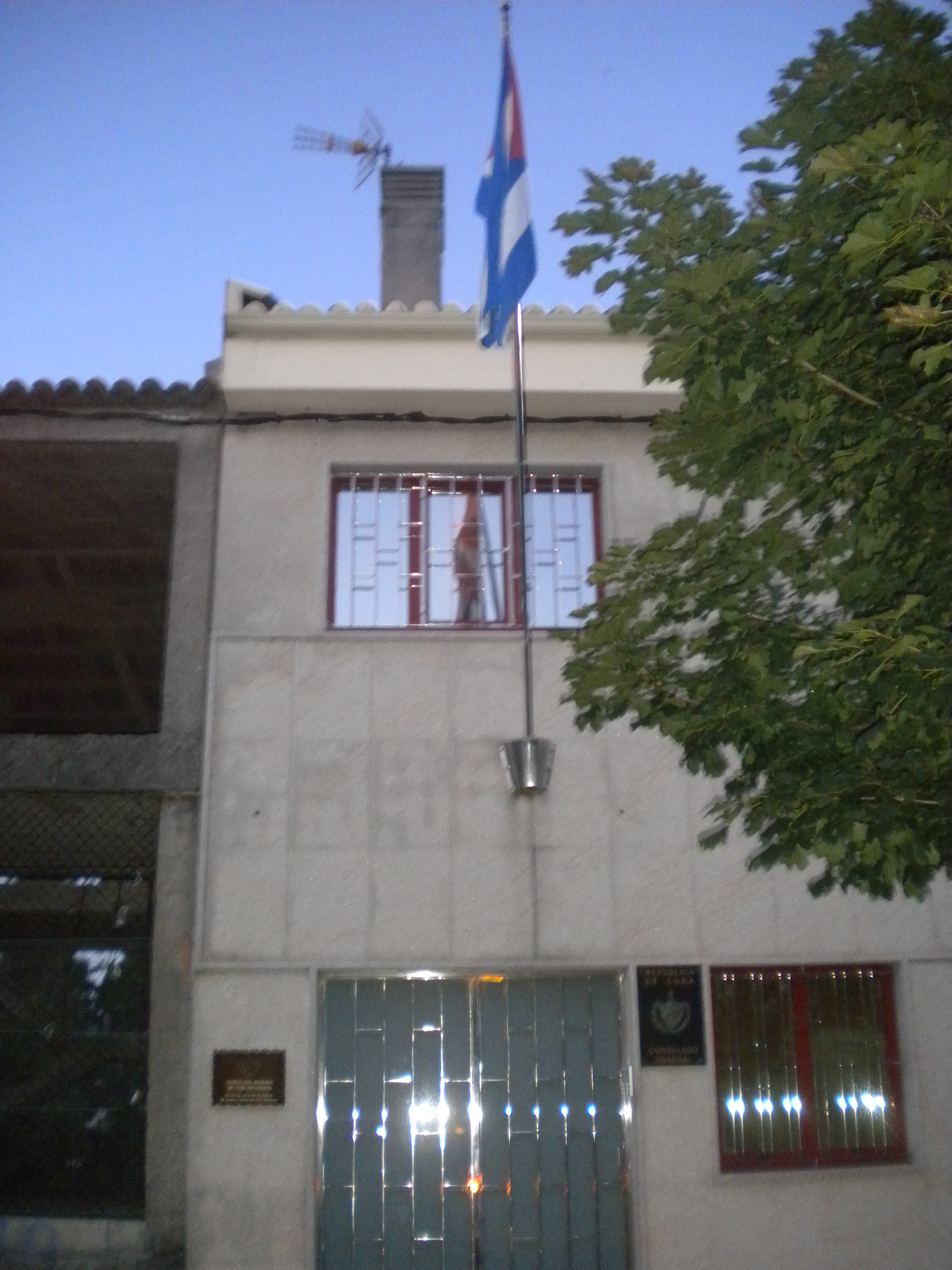
Consulate-General in Santiago de Compostela

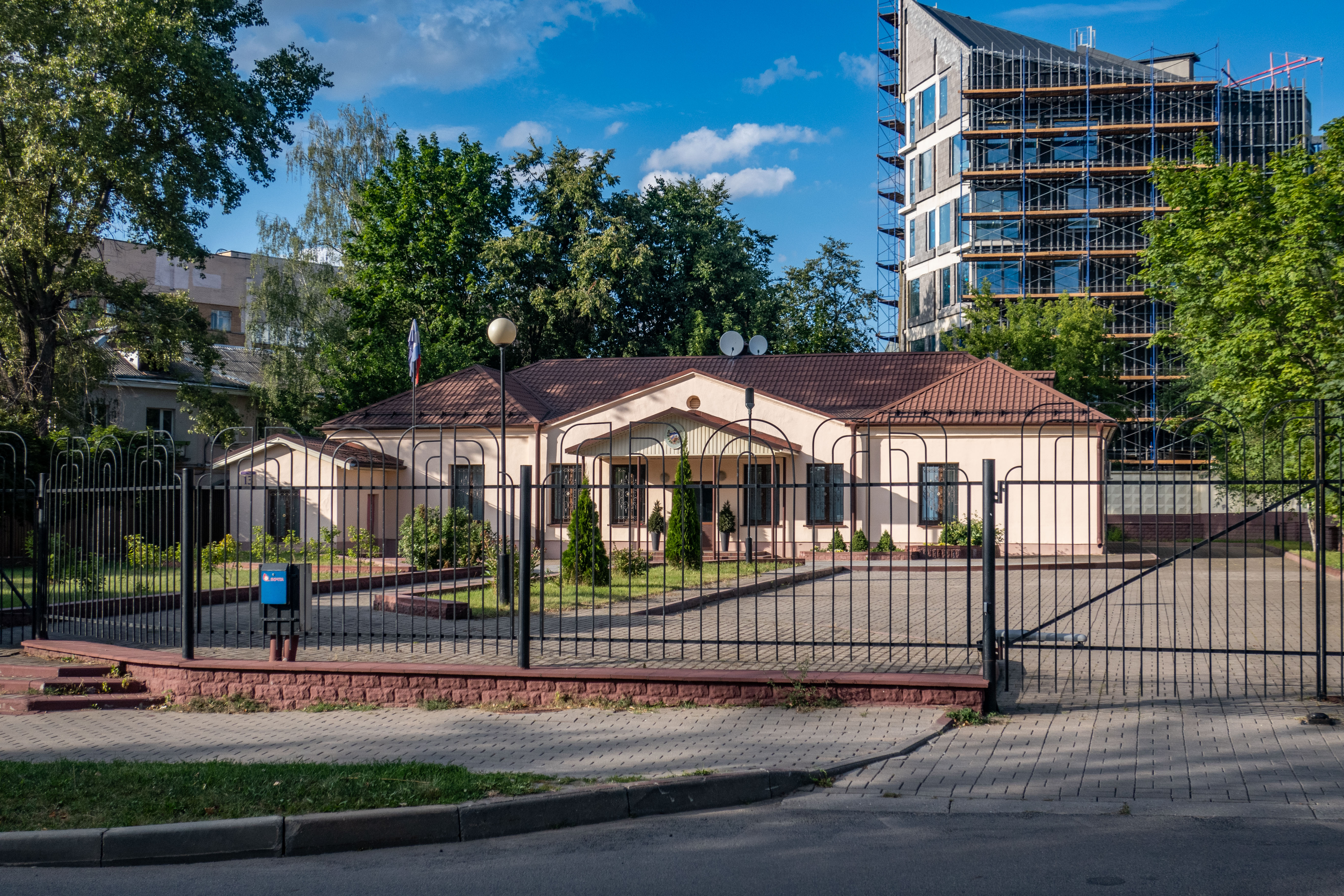
Embassy in Minsk

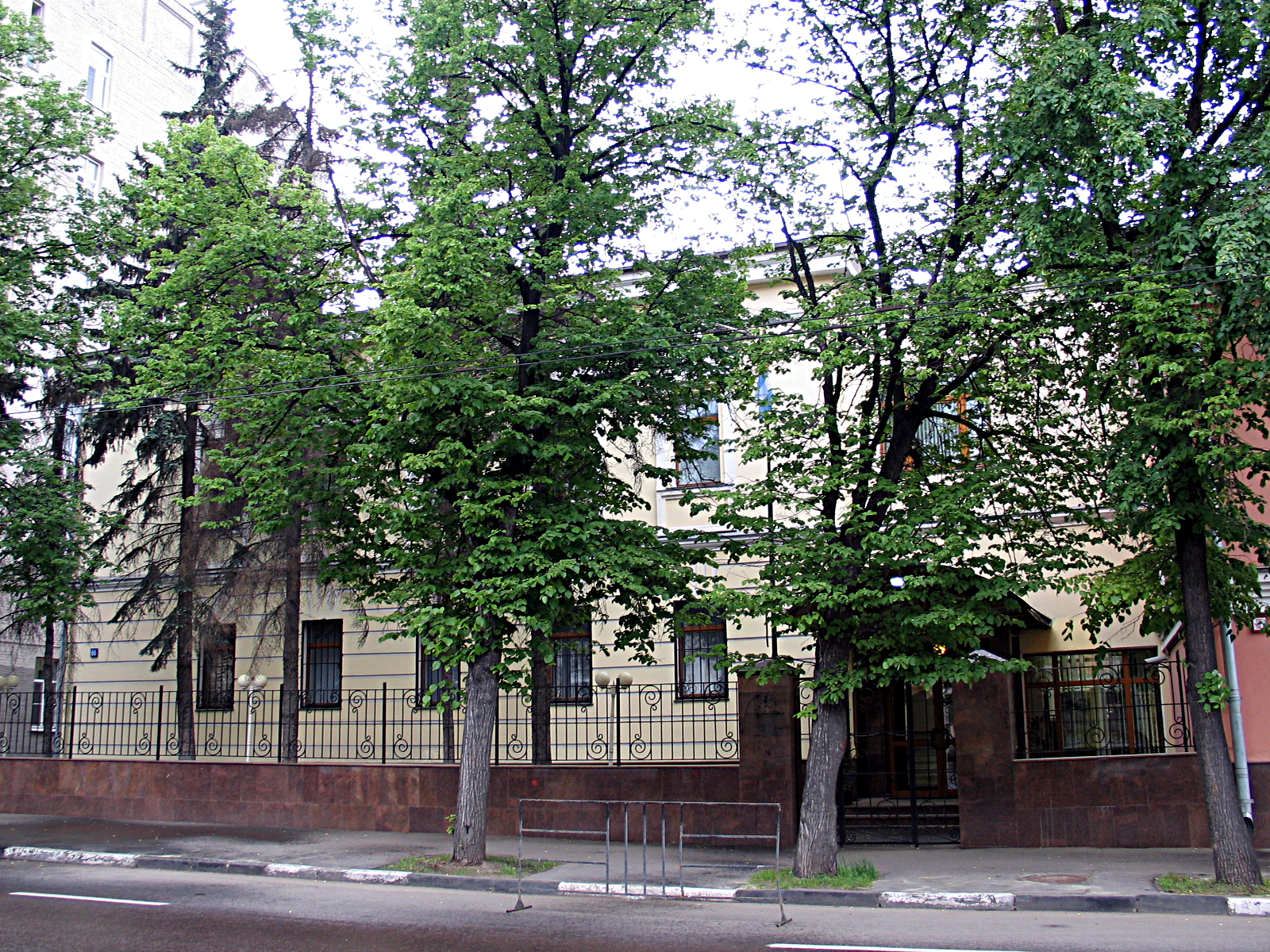
Embassy in Moscow

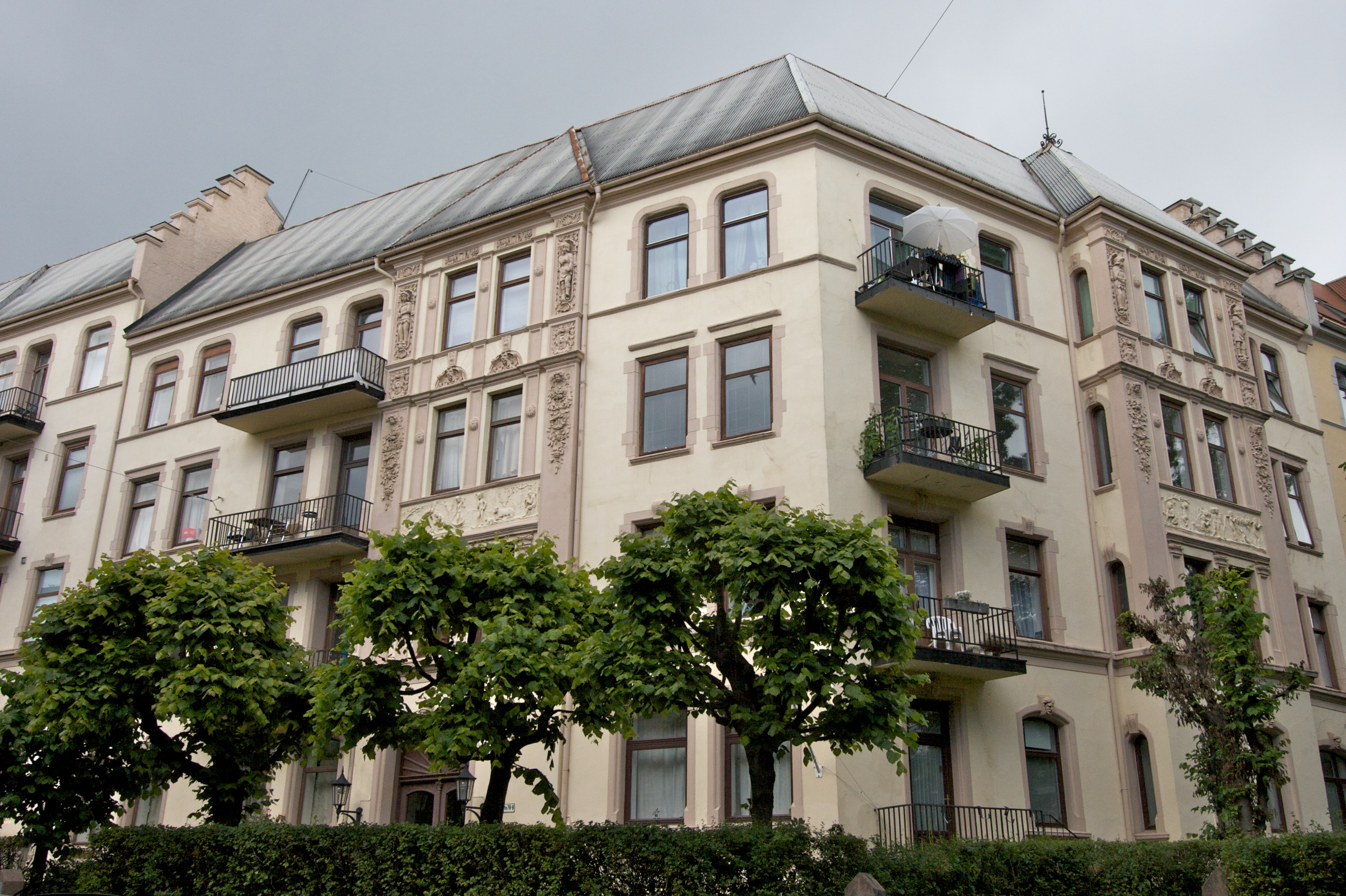
Embassy in Oslo

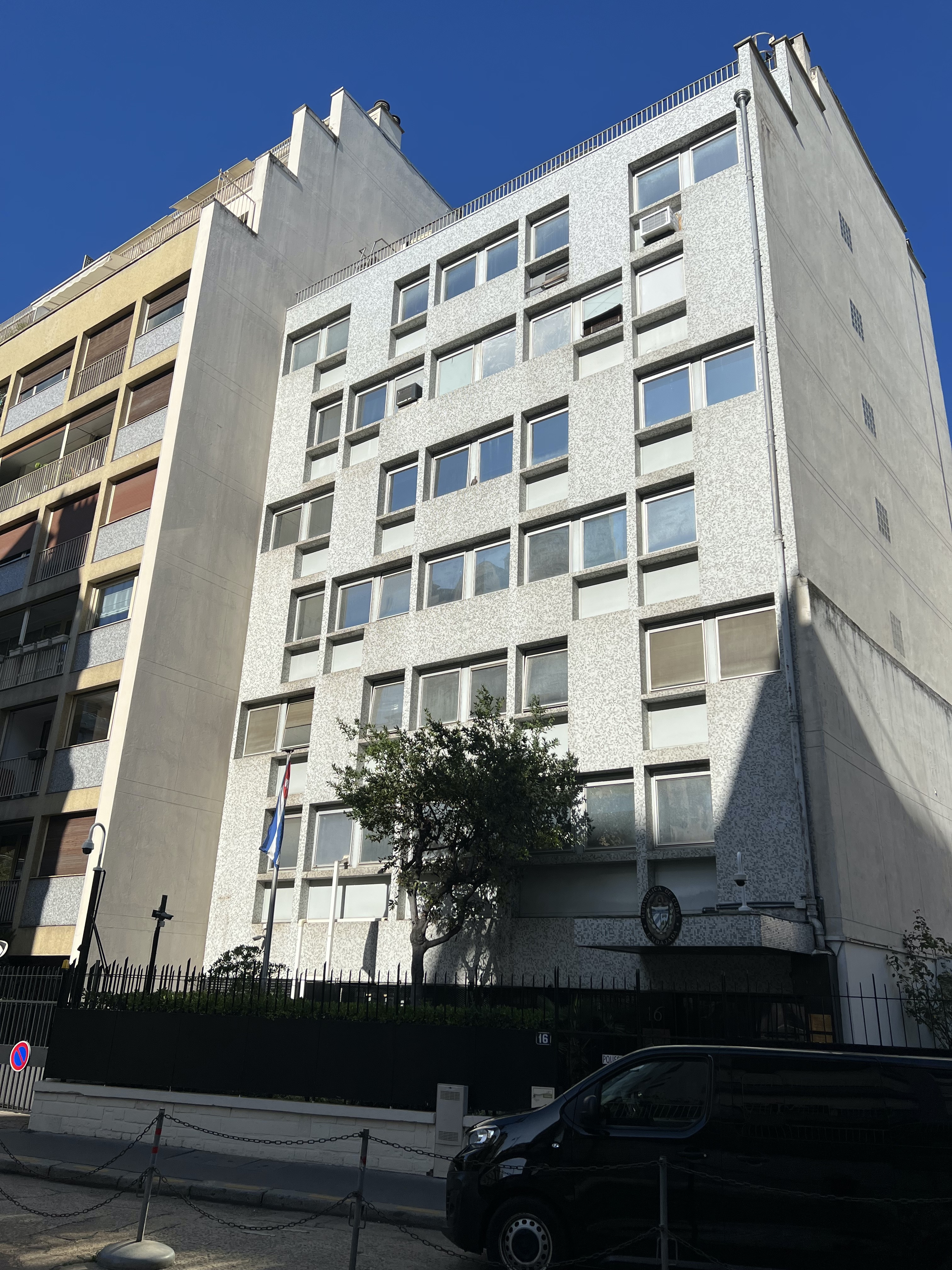
Embassy in Paris

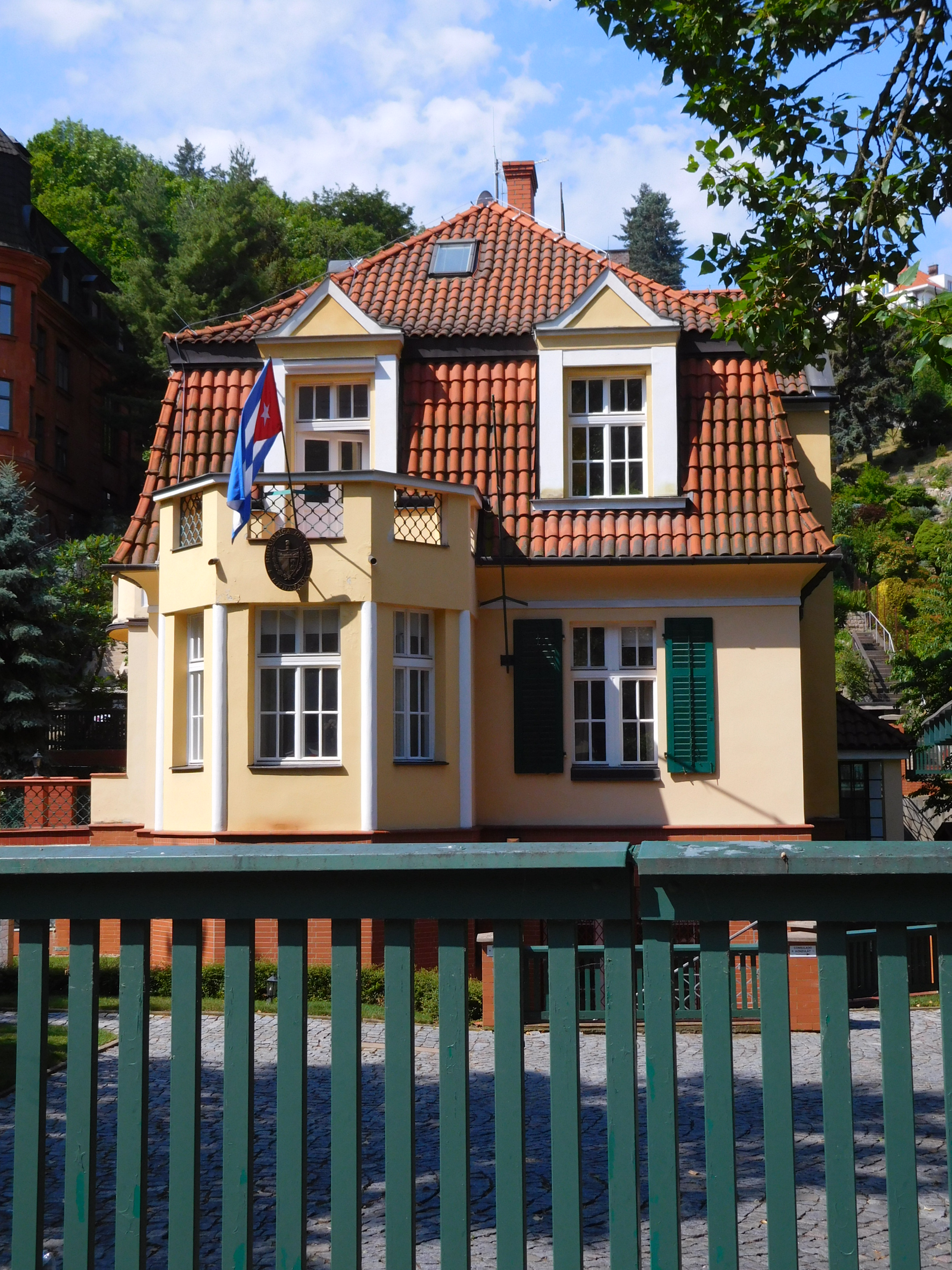
Embassy in Prague

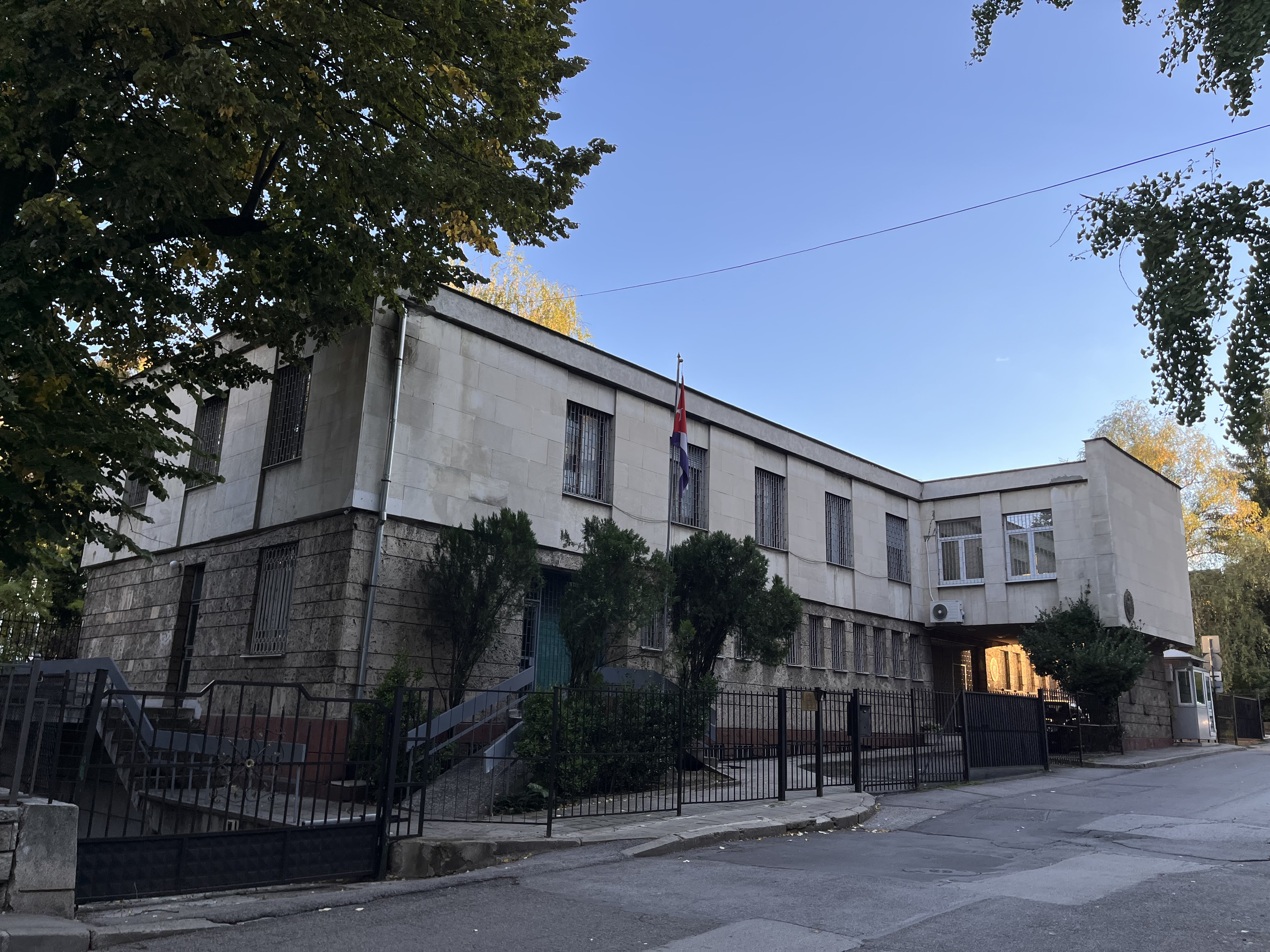
Embassy in Sofia

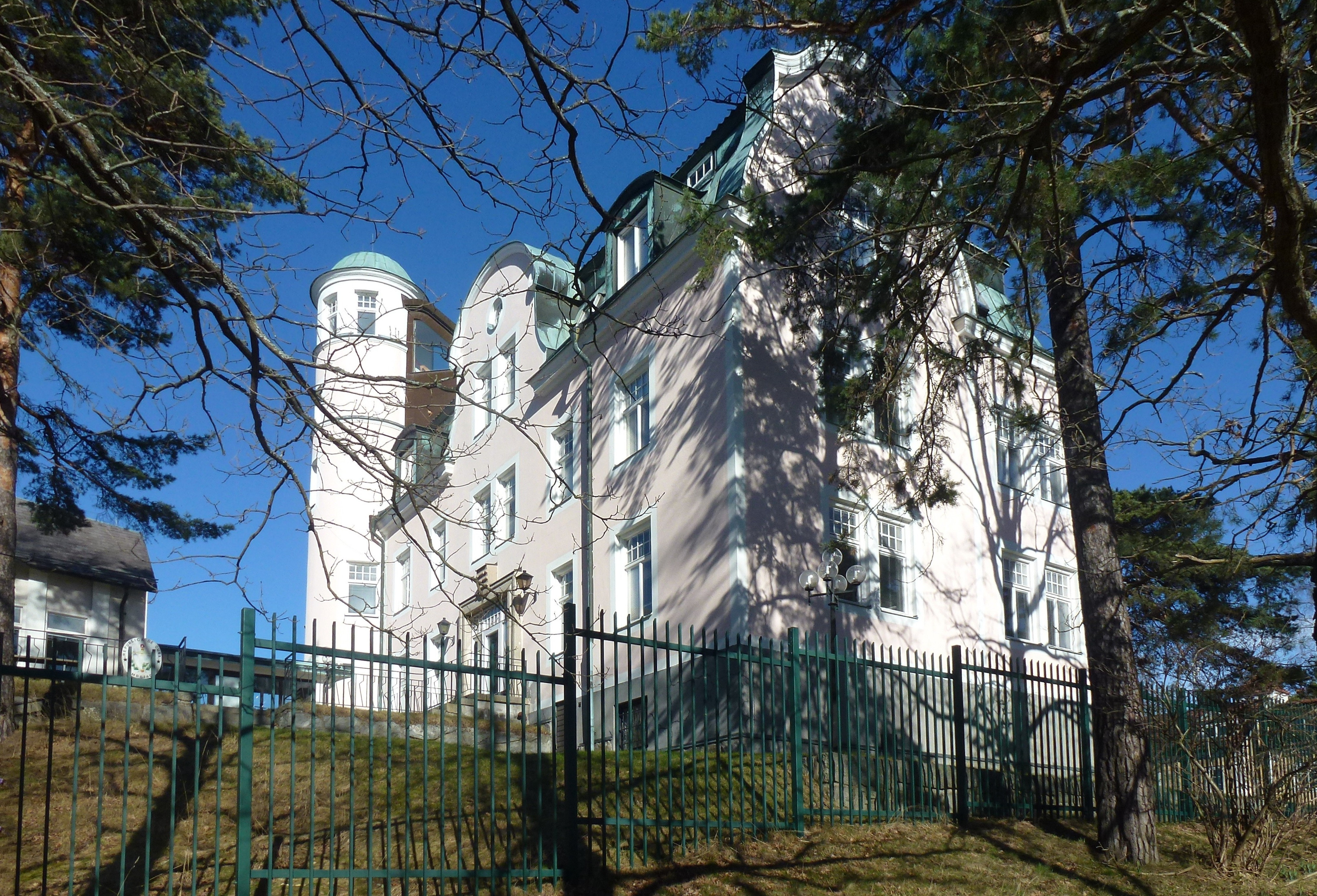
Embassy in Stockholm

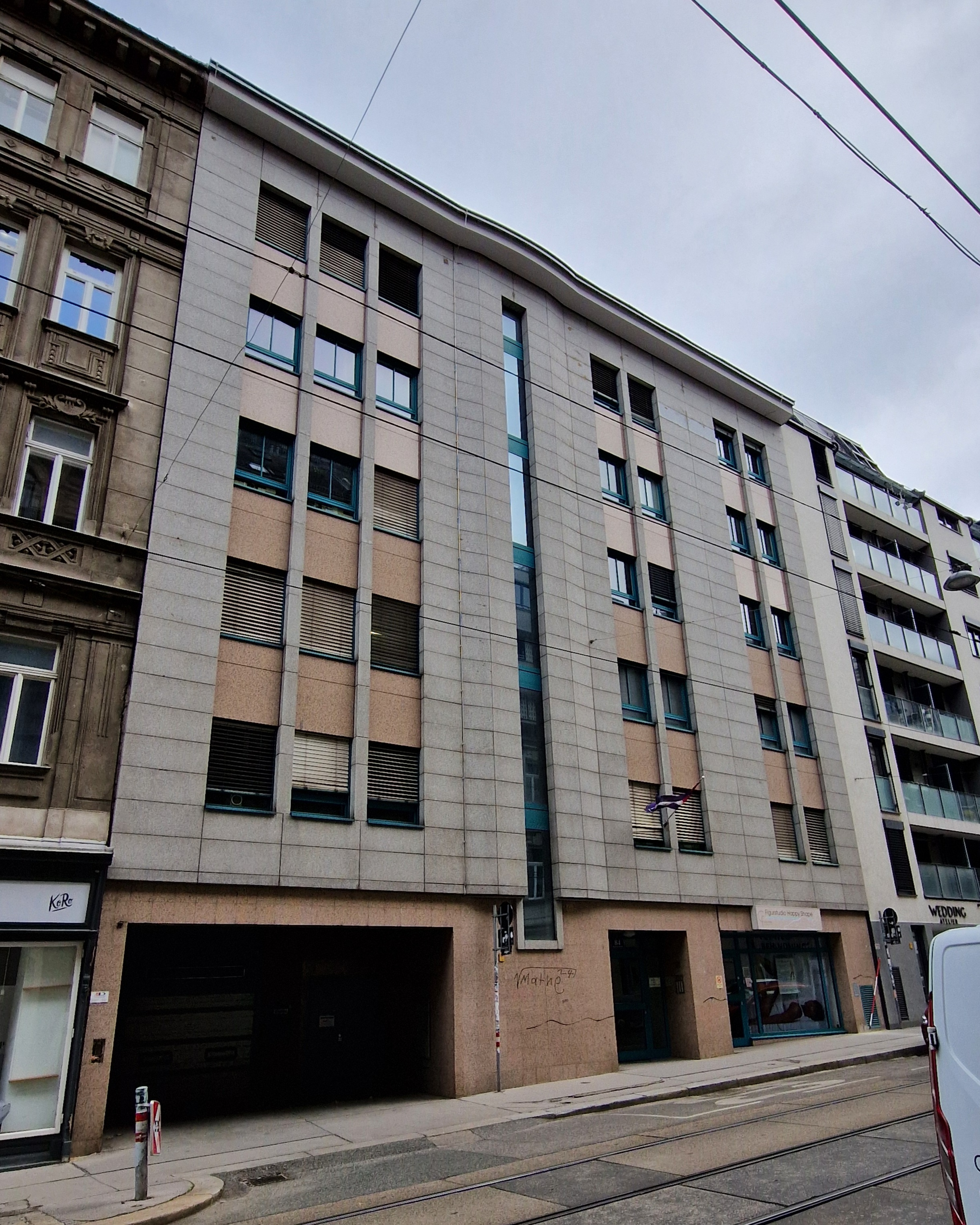
Embassy in Vienna

=== Oceania ===
Host country	Host city	Mission	Concurrent accreditation	Ref.
Australia	Canberra	Embassy		
Fiji	Suva	Embassy	Countries: Kiribati; Marshall Islands; Micronesia; Nauru; Palau; Papua New Guinea; Samoa; Solomon Islands; Tonga; Tuvalu; Vanuatu	
New Zealand	Wellington	Embassy	Countries: Cook Islands	

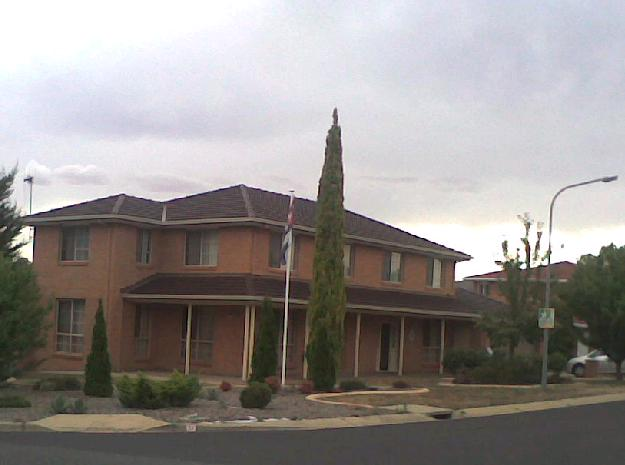
Embassy in Canberra

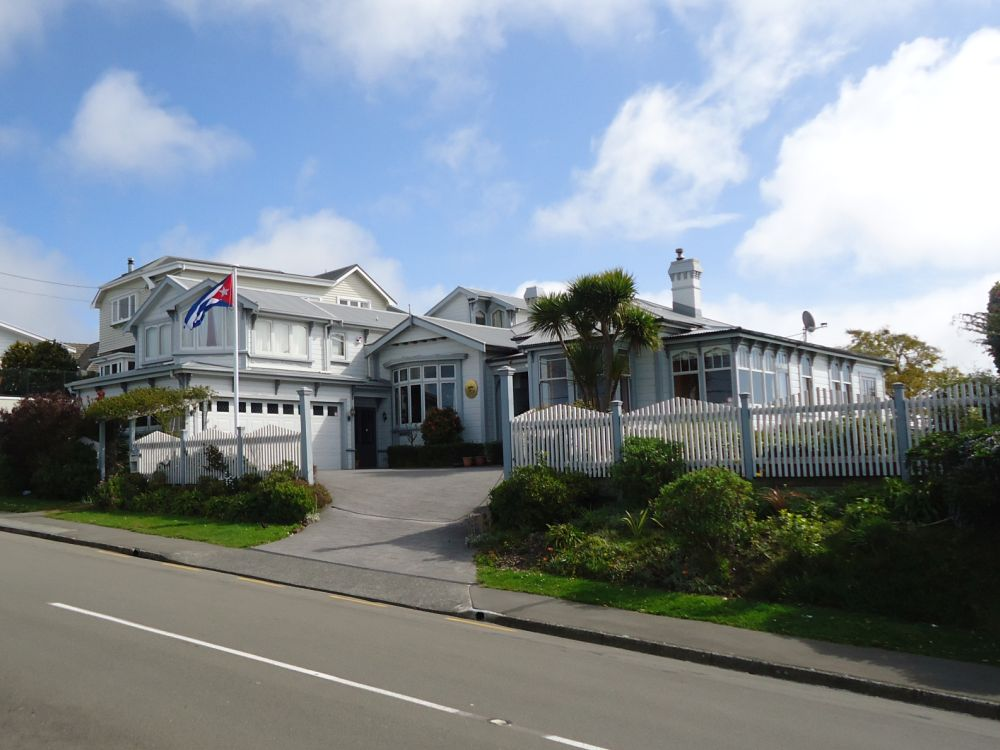
Embassy in Wellington

=== Multilateral organizations ===
Organization	Host city	Host country	Mission	Concurrent accreditation	Ref.
United Nations	New York City	United States	Permanent Mission		
United Nations	Geneva	Switzerland	Permanent Mission	International Organizations: International Labour Organization; UNCTAD; World Economic Forum; World Health Organization; World Trade Organization	
UNESCO	Paris	France	Permanent Mission		

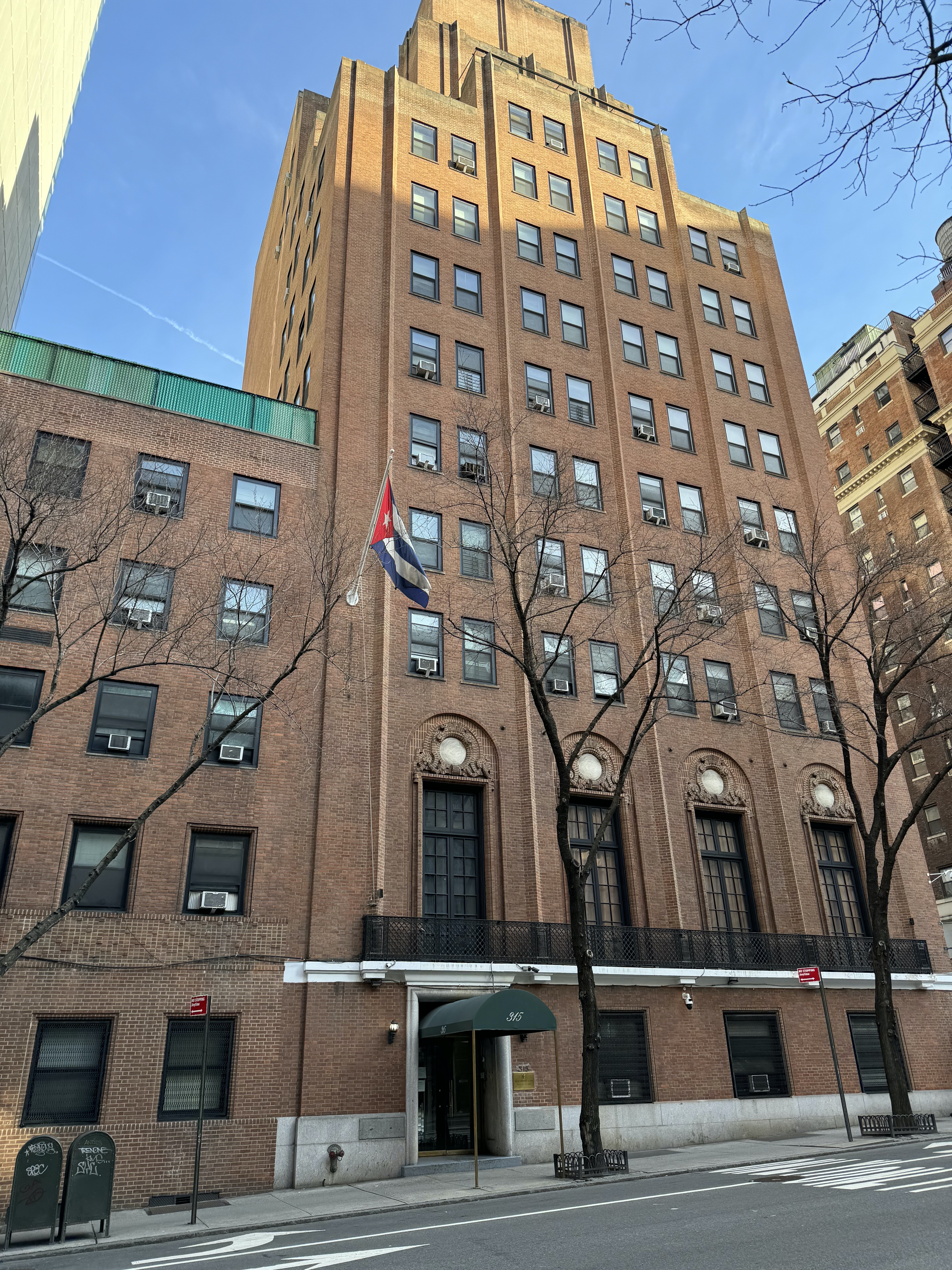
Permanent Mission to the United Nations in New York

== Closed missions ==
=== Africa ===
Host country	Host city	Mission	Year closed	Ref.
Libya	Tripoli	Embassy (Note: Resident in Tunis, Tunisia)	Unknown	
Madagascar	Antananarivo	Embassy (Note: Resident in Nairobi, Kenya)	Unknown	
Somalia	Mogadishu	Embassy	1977	

=== Americas ===
Host country	Host city	Mission	Year closed	Ref.
Brazil	Manaus	Consulate-General	Unknown	
Ecuador	Quito	Embassy	2026	
United States	Baltimore (Maryland)	Consulate-General	1961	
United States	Boston (Massachusetts)	Consulate-General	1961	
United States	Chicago (Illinois)	Consulate	1961	
United States	Cincinnati (Ohio)	Consulate	1957	
United States	Detroit (Michigan)	Consulate	1958	
United States	Galveston (Texas)	Consulate	1960	
United States	Honolulu (Hawaii)	Consulate	1932	
United States	Houston (Texas)	Consulate	1960	
United States	Jacksonville (Florida)	Consulate	1960	
United States	Kansas City (Missouri)	Consulate	1957	
United States	Key West (Florida)	Consulate	1961	
United States	Los Angeles (California)	Consulate-General	1961	
United States	Miami (Florida)	Consulate-General	1961	
United States	Mobile (Alabama)	Consulate	1961	
United States	New Orleans (Louisiana)	Consulate-General	1961	
United States	New York City (New York)	Consulate-General	1961	
United States	Norfolk (Virginia)	Consulate	1961	
United States	Philadelphia (Pennsylvania)	Consulate-General	1961	
United States	Saint Louis (Missouri)	Consulate	1960	
United States	San Francisco (California)	Consulate-General	1961	
United States	San Juan (Puerto Rico)	Consulate-General	1960	
United States	Savannah (Georgia)	Consulate	1961	
United States	Tampa (Florida)	Consulate-General	1960	

=== Asia ===
Host country	Host city	Mission	Year closed	Ref.
Iraq	Baghdad	Embassy (Note: Resident in Tehran, Iran)	Unknown	
Israel	Tel Aviv	Embassy	1973	
Philippines	Manila	Embassy (Note: Resident in Kuala Lumpur, Malaysia)	2013	
Yemen	Sana'a	Embassy (Note: Resident in Riyadh, Saudi Arabia)	2015	

=== Europe ===
Host country	Host city	Mission	Year closed	Ref.
Albania	Tirana	Embassy (Note: Resident in Sofia, Bulgaria)	1992	

=== Oceania ===
Host country	Host city	Mission	Year closed	Ref.
Kiribati	Tarawa	Embassy (Note: Resident in Suva, Rewa, Central Division, Fiji)	Unknown	

== Missions to open ==
- Cameroon
  - Yaoundé (Embassy)
- Libya
  - Tripoli (Embassy)

== See also ==
- Foreign relations of Cuba
- List of diplomatic missions in Cuba
- Visa policy of Cuba
