= Francisco Oves-Fernandez =

Cuban archbishop (1928–1990)

His excellency Archbishop Francisco Oves-Fernandez
- Archbishop of San Cristóbal de la Habana
- Appointed: January 26, 1970
- In office: 1970–1981
- Predecessor: Evelio Díaz-Cía
- Successor: Jaime Lucas Ortega y Alamino

Orders
- Ordination: April 13, 1952
- Consecration: July 16, 1969

Personal details
- Born: October 4, 1928 Camagüey, Cuba
- Died: December 4, 1990 (aged 62) El Paso, Texas, US

Francisco Ricardo Oves-Fernandez (October 4, 1928 in Camagüey, Cuba – December 4, 1990 in El Paso, Texas, US) was the archbishop of the Archdiocese of Havana.

== Background ==
Oves-Fernandez studied in the Seminary of San Basilio Magno, El Cobre, Oriente, Cuba. He was later sent by the Archbishop of Santiago de Cuba, Mons. Enrique Pérez-Serantes, to study at the Pontificia Universidad de Comillas in Spain.

Oves-Fernandez was ordained a priest on April 13, 1952, by Mons. Enrique Pérez-Serantes, archbishop of Santiago de Cuba, in the Cathedral of Camagüey. In the diocese of Camagüey he was assigned to the parish of Santa Cruz del Sur from 1952 to 1961 and director of TV programing. After the Cuban Revolution of 1959, he was one of the first priests to realize the Marxist-Leninist orientation of the revolution. In April 1961, after the failed Bay of Pigs Invasion, he was expelled from Camagüey along with other members of the clergy. He took refuge in Havana along with Mons. Eduardo Boza-Masvidal, Auxiliary Bishop of Havana. In September 1961, he was exiled to Spain on the ship Covadonga, along with Mons. Boza and more than another 150 priests.

Oves-Fernandez went to Rome with Mons. Boza and Father Agnelio Blanco and had an interview with Pope John XXIII. While in Rome, he received a Doctorate in Social Sciences from Pontificia Universidad de Santo Tomás de Aquino. In 1965, the head of mission of the Vatican in Cuba Mons. Cesare Zacchi, was able to get Father Oves returned to Cuba. The Bishop of Camagüey, Mons. Adolfo Rodríguez-Herrera opposed his return to Cuba. He was a professor at the San Carlos and San Ambrosio Seminary in Havana.

Oves-Fernandez was elevated as Titular Bishop of Montecorvino and named auxiliary bishop of Cienfuegos by Pope Paul VI on April 25, 1969. On July 16, 1969, he was consecrated in the Cathedral of Cienfuegos by Mons. Cesare Zacchi, Titular Bishop of Zella, and assisted by Mons. Alfredo Muller-San Martin, Bishop of Cienfuegos and Mons. Adolfo Rodríguez-Herrera, Bishop of Camagüey. He was promoted as Archbishop of Havana on January 26, 1970, succeeding Mons. Evelio Díaz-Cía. He later became sick from nerves and was taken to Rome in the beginning of 1980. The Pope designated an apostolic administrator, sede plena, for the Archdiocese of Havana Mons. Pedro Meurice Estiu, on February 20, 1980. He resigned his position on March 28, 1981. He was succeeded by Mons. Jaime Lucas Ortega y Alamino, the Bishop of the Diocese of Pinar del Río. In 1982, Oves-Fernandez went to live in El Paso, Texas in the United States and was assigned to the parish of Santo Niño de Atocha.

=== Death and funeral ===
On December 4, 1990, Oves-Fernandez died on in El Paso, Texas of a heart attack. His body was transferred to Miami, Florida and his body was displayed at the Shrine of Nuestra Señora de la Caridad del Cobre on Sunday, December 8, 1990. The funeral took place at the Cathedral of Saint Mary the following day. The mass was celebrated by Mons. Jaime Lucas Ortega y Alamino, Archbishop of Havana, the successor of Mons. Oves, who traveled from Cuba to assist in the Mass, along with Mons. Agustin Roman, auxiliary bishop of the Archdiocese of Miami, Mons. Enrique San Pedro, S.J., Auxiliary Bishop of the Diocese of Galveston-Houston, Mons. Roberto Octavio González, O.F.M., Auxiliary Bishop of the Archdiocese of Boston, and 44 other priests, mainly Cuban exiles. He was buried at Our Lady of Mercy Cemetery in the area reserved for bishops and priests. A second funeral mass was celebrated in the Cathedral of Havana on December 13, presided by Archbishop Ortega.

Catholic Church titles
Preceded by Evelio Díaz y Cía	Archbishop of San Cristóbal de la Habana; 1970–81	Succeeded by Jaime Lucas Ortega y Alamino
