= Eduardo Boza-Masvidal =

Servant of God Eduardo Tomás Boza Masvidal
- Titular Bishop of Vinda
- See: Vinda
- Appointed: 31 Mar 1960
- Retired: 21 Mar 1963
- Predecessor: Jean-Marie Villot
- Successor: Francesco Beschi

Orders
- Ordination: 28 Feb 1944 by Manuel Arteaga y Betancourt
- Consecration: 15 May 1960 by Evelio Díaz-Cía

Personal details
- Born: 18 September 1915 Camagüey, Republic of Cuba
- Died: 16 March 2003 (aged 87) Los Teques, Bolivarian Republic of Venezuela
- Buried: St. Philip Neri Cathedral, Los Teques
- Parents: Aurelio Boza and Clemencia Masvidal
- Education: Colegio De La Salle; University of Havana
- Motto: No he venido a ser servido, sino a servir

Eduardo Tomas Boza-Masvidal (September 18, 1915 in Camagüey, Cuba – March 16, 2003 in Los Teques, Venezuela) was the Auxiliary Bishop of the Archdiocese of Havana.

== Biography ==
His parents were Aurelio Boza and Clemencia Masvidal. He was baptised in the Church of Nuestra Señora de la Soledad, in Camagüey, on November 18, 1915. He graduated from Colegio de La Salle, in Vedado, Havana and afterwards received a Doctorate in Philosophy and Letters in 1940 from the University of Havana. In 1935 he studied at the San Carlos and San Ambrosio Seminary, where he did all his ecclesiastic studies.

He was ordained on February 28, 1944, in the Cathedral of Havana by the Archbishop of Havana Manuel Arteaga-Betancourt. He was assigned to the Parish of San Salvador in El Cerro, Havana for a year. He was then made a professor at the San Carlos and San Ambrosio Seminary and chaplain of the Colegio del Sagrado Corazón (School of the Sacred Heart). Later he was assigned to the parish of San Luis in Madruga and in 1948 assigned to the parish of Nuestra Señora de la Caridad (Our Lady of Charity), in Havana, where he remained until 1961. He was also prosecutor in the Ecclesiastical Tribunal and Rector of the Catholic Universidad Católica de Santo Tomás de Villanueva.

He was chosen by Pope John XXIII as Titular Bishop of Vinda and Auxiliary Bishop of San Cristobal de la Habana (Havana) on March 31, 1960. He was expelled from Cuba by the dictator Fidel Castro in September 1961. He traveled to Spain and established his residence in Los Teques, Venezuela where he was a priest. He participated in the Second Vatican Council (1962–1965). He is the founder of the "Unión de Cubanos en el Exilio" (UCE) (Union of Cubans in Exile).

He died on March 16, 2003, from complications of pneumonia at the Medical Center of Los Teques in Venezuela. Since 2012 he is in process of beatification and the diocese has finished its diocesan phase and has sent it to Rome.
