= Vinda (see) =

Vinda was an Ancient city and bishopric in North Africa and is now a Latin Catholic titular see.

== History ==
Vinda was a city in the Roman province of Africa proconsularis, near modern Henchir-Bandou in present Tunisia.

It was important enough to become a suffragan bishopric of the Metropolitan in the provincial capital, Carthage.

It was occupied by Donatist bishop Reparatus in 411.

== Titular see ==
The diocese was nominally restored in 1928 as a Latin Catholic titular see.

It has had the following incumbents, both of the lowest (episcopal) and intermediary (archiepiscopal) ranks:

- Titular Bishop Edgard Aristide Maranta, Capuchin Friars Minor (O.F.M. Cap.) (1930.03.27 – 1953.03.25), Apostolic Vicar of Dar-es-Salaam (Tanzania) (1930.03.27 – 1953.03.25), later promoted Metropolitan Archbishop of Dar-es-Salaam (Tanzania) (1953.03.25 – 1968.12.19), also Apostolic Administrator of Zanzibar and Pemba (Tanzania) (1964.12.12 – 1966), later Titular Archbishop of Castro (1968.12.19 – 1975.01.29)
- Titular Bishop Jean-Marie Villot (1954.09.02 – 1959.12.17), Auxiliary Bishop of Paris (France) (1954.09.02 – 1959.12.17), Titular Archbishop of Bosporus (1959.12.17 – 1965.01.17), Coadjutor Archbishop of Lyon (France) (1959.12.17 – 1965.01.17), succeeding as Metropolitan Archbishop of Lyon (1965.01.17 – 1967.04.07), Undersecretary of the Central Commission for the Coordination of the Postconciliar Work and the Interpretation of Conciliar Resolutions (1962 – 1965.01.17), Cardinal-Priest of SS. Trinità al Monte Pincio (1965.02.25 – 1974.12.12), Prefect of Sacred Congregation for Clergy (1967.04.07 – 1969.04.23), President of the Pontifical Commission for the Vatican City State (1969 – 1979.03.09), Papal Secretary of State of the Papal Secretariat of State (1969.05.02 – 1979.03.09), Prefect of the Council for the Public Affairs of the Church (1969.05.02 – 1979.03.09), President of the Administration of the Patrimony of the Apostolic See (1969.05.02 – 1979.03.09), Cardinal Protector of the Pontifical Ecclesiastical Academy (1969.05.02 – 1979.03.09), Chamberlain of the Holy Roman Church of Apostolic Camera (1970.10.16 – 1979.03.09), President of the Pontifical Council Cor Unum (1971.07.15 – 1978.09.04), Cardinal-Bishop of Frascati (1974.12.12 – 1979.03.09)
- Titular Bishop Eduardo Tomás Boza Masvidal (1960.03.31 – 2003.03.16), Auxiliary Bishop of the Archdiocese of Havana
- Titular Bishop Francesco Beschi (2003.03.25 – 2009.01.22), later bishop of Bergamo
- Titular Archbishop Franco Coppola (2009.07.16 – …), Apostolic Nuncio (papal ambassador) to Chad and to the Central African Republic
