= Alfredo Llaguno-Canals =

Bishop Alfredo Llaguno
- Born: December 12, 1902; Havana, Cuba
- Died: August 20, 1979 (aged 76); Havana, Cuba

Alfredo Ignacio Llaguno Canals (December 12, 1902 – August 20, 1979) was the Auxiliary Bishop of the Archdiocese of Havana.

His parents were Marino Llaguno and Rosario Canals. He was baptized at the Church of Nuestra Señora de la Caridad (Our Lady of Charity). He started his religious studies at San Carlos and San Ambrosio Seminary in Havana and later went to the Colegio Pío Latino in Rome and studied at the Pontifical Gregorian University in Rome, where he received his Doctorate in Theology in 1929.

He was ordained in Rome on October 28, 1928. He returned to Cuba and had a long and varied religious career: he worked in the Secretariat of the Archdiocese of Havana, chaplain of the Asilo Truffin and Professor of History at the Seminary of San Carlos and San Ambrosio in 1929; the following year, 1930, he was named administrative chaplain of San Francisco de Paula Hospital and the Parish of San Francisco de Paula and the Professor of Theology at the Seminary of San Carlos and San Ambrosio. In 1932, he was named Professor of Catholic Dogma at the Seminary of San Carlos and San Ambrosio. Over the years he was given more and more positions in the Archdiocese.

He was made Titular Bishop of Suliana and Auxiliary Bishop of the Archdiocese of Havana on March 17, 1964. He was consecrated at the Cathedral of Havana by Mons. Evelio Diaz-Cia, Archbishop of Havana and assisted by Mons. José Maximino Domínguez-Rodríguez, Bishop of the Diocese of Matanzas, and Mons. Adolfo Rodríguez-Herrera, Titular Bishop of Tiberiopolis and Auxiliary Bishop of the Archdiocese of Camagüey on Sunday, May 17, 1964. He authored a letter from the Episcopal Conference of Cuba on April 10, 1969, in which the bishops of Cuba asked for the elimination of the economic blockade against Cuba. He retired as Auxiliary Bishop on January 26, 1970, when Archbishop Diaz-Cia retired. In 1975, retired for health reasons as the pastor of the Parish of San Francisco de Paula, a position he held for 45 years since 1930.

He died on August 20, 1979, in Havana after a long illness. He had his funeral at his Parish Church of San Francisco de Paula, on Mayía Rodríguez Street and Espadero in La Víbora. He was a close friend of Alonso del Portillo-Marcano and baptized both his son, Alonso J. del Portillo-Tamargo and his grandson, Alonso R. del Portillo at the Church San Francisco de Paula.
