= Bonaventure Broderick =

American Catholic prelate

Bonaventure Finnbarr Francis Broderick (December 25, 1868 – November 18, 1943) was an American Catholic prelate who served as Auxiliary Bishop of San Cristóbal de la Habana from 1903 to 1905. He later ran a gas station for several years until Archbishop Francis Spellman restored his ministry, putting him in service in the Archdiocese of New York.

Effective December 1, 1939, Spellman assigned the bishop to the chaplaincy of the Frances Schervier Home and Hospital in Riverdale and in 1942 named him vicar for religious in the archdiocese.

== Early life and education ==
Bonaventure Broderick was born in Hartford, Connecticut. He was the son of John Harris Broderick and Margaret Healy. Broderick completed his undergraduate seminary studies at St. Charles College in Ellicott City, Maryland. The bishop of the Roman Catholic Diocese of Hartford sent him to the Pontifical Athenaeum S. Apollinare of Propaganda Fide while a seminarian at the North American College. In 1897, Broderick earned his PhD. He also earned a Doctor of Theology at the same university. Under the tutelage of well-known archaeologist Orazio Marucchi, Father Broderick soon became one of the foremost experts on graffiti in the catacombs of Rome. In recognition of his academic accomplishments he became the first American member of The Arcadia, the centuries-old Italian literary society.

== Priesthood ==
On July 25, 1896, Broderick was ordained a priest for the Diocese of Hartford by then Bishop Francesco di Paola Cassetta, who was the Patriarch of Jerusalem and Viceregent of Rome. Broderick returned to the diocese and was assigned as a pastor in West Hartford, Connecticut. From 1898 to 1900, he was a faculty member at St. Thomas Seminary at Hartford, Connecticut.

When his former Italian instructor, Bishop Donato Sbarretti, was appointed as the ordinary of the Archdiocese of San Cristóbal de la Habana, he appointed Broderick as his secretary. On June 25, 1900, Broderick became the administrator of St. Francis de Sales Church in Cuba. He would later become the administrator of San Carlos and San Ambrosio Seminary. While in Cuba, as secretary to the bishop, Broderick was tasked with settling the question of Church property following the 1898 War with Spain. In recognition of his success in doing so Pope Leo XIII named Broderick a monsignor in 1901. On May 20, 1902, Broderick represented the Catholic Church recognizing the establishment of the Republic of Cuba.

== Episcopacy ==
On September 7, 1903, Broderick was appointed by Pope Pius X as the Auxiliary Bishop of the Archdiocese of San Cristóbal de la Habana and Titular Bishop of Iuliopolis. On October 28, 1903, he was consecrated as the Auxiliary Bishop of San Cristóbal de la Habana. His Principal Consecrator was Archbishop Placide Louis Chapelle with Archbishop Francisco de Paula Barnada y Aguilar as the Principal Co-Consecrator.

=== Resignation ===
In the fall of 1904, Chapelle, the Apostolic Delegate to Cuba went to Rome to inform the Vatican of rumors that Broderick was involved in a conspiracy to share in commissions to sell Church property. Broderick followed Chapelle to Rome and successfully defended himself.

Pius X decided that rather than send the bishop back to Cuba, he should go to Washington as an auxiliary bishop to Cardinal James Gibbons and manage the Peter's Pence Collection throughout the United States. Gibbons objected to the arrangement and the Vatican revoked the assignment.

Broderick then wrote a letter to the Pope Pius X saying in essence that, as a bishop, if he were left without an assignment it might appear as a scandal to some. The pope misunderstood the letter and interpreted it as a threat to cause scandal. As a result of the misunderstanding Broderick was set adrift without an assignment and with a one-hundred-dollar per month pension.

On March 1, 1905, Broderick officially resigned as Auxiliary Bishop due to another misunderstanding with Pope Pius X and the Vatican over the collection of some funds.

=== Restoration to episcopal life ===
On the eve of Francis Spellman's May 23, 1939, installation as Archbishop of New York, Cardinal Amleto Cicognani, the apostolic delegate to the United States, asked Spellman to look into the matter of Broderick's long exile. Within months, while doing some archdiocesan business in Millbrook, New York, Spellman sought out Broderick in Millbrook, where, in addition to running a gas station, he also wrote a weekly column for the Millbrook Round Table, a local newspaper.

The two had a lengthy conversation, the summary of which is found in a letter written by Spellman to Cicognani and reproduced in Robert Gannon's biography, The Cardinal Spellman Story. Spellman was able to bring an end to the bishop's long exile, and effective December 1, 1939, made him a chaplain of the Frances Schervier Home and Hospital in Riverdale, New York.

In 1942, at the dedication of a new wing to the Schervier facility, Spellman said: "The greatest thing I have done for my soul and the greatest gift I have brought to the people of the archdiocese has been in bringing Bishop Broderick to New York." Also in 1942, Spellman named Broderick the vicar for religious in the archdiocese.

James K. Hanna has written a biography of Broderick, titled "The Remarkable Life of Bishop Bonaventure Broderick: Exile, Redemption, and a Gas Station" (Serif Press, 2022). The Remarkable Life of Bishop Bonaventure Broderick

== Final years and death ==
On November 18, 1943, Broderick died with the title of Auxiliary Bishop Emeritus of the San Cristóbal de la Habana Archdiocese. His mortal remains are buried in Gate of Heaven Cemetery, Hawthorne, New York in the Sisters of St. Francis plot.
