= Félix Varela =

Cuban Catholic priest and independence leader

Venerable Félix Varela Morales
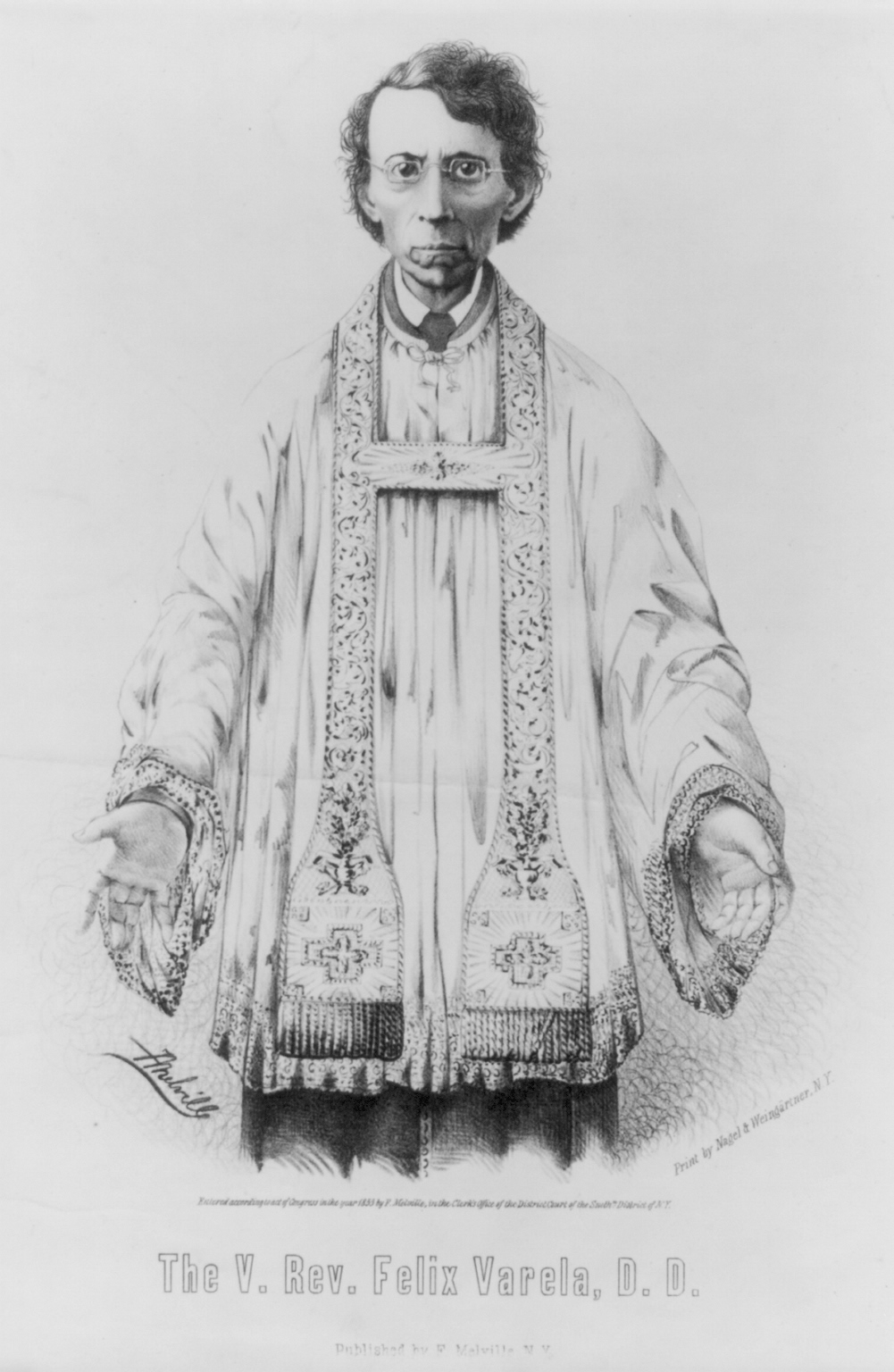
- Felix Varela circa 1853
- Born: November 20, 1788; Havana, Captaincy General of Cuba
- Died: February 18, 1853 (aged 64); St. Augustine, Florida, United States

Félix Varela y Morales (November 20, 1788 – February 18, 1853) was a Cuban Catholic priest and independence leader who is regarded as a notable figure in the Catholic Church in both his native Cuba and the United States, where he also served.

== Life ==
Varela was born in Havana, Cuba, then a captaincy of New Spain, and grew up in St. Augustine, Florida, the grandson of Lieutenant colonel Bartolomé Morales, the commander of military forces in Spanish Florida, who was stationed there and who helped to raise Felix after the death of his mother in childbirth. As a teenager, he refused his grandfather's offer to send him to a military academy in Spain, returning to Cuba, where he studied to become a priest at San Carlos and San Ambrosio Seminary in Havana, the only seminary in Cuba. He also studied at the University of Havana. At the age of 23, he was ordained in the Cathedral of Havana for the Diocese of San Cristóbal de la Habana.

Joining the seminary faculty within a year of his ordination, he taught philosophy, physics, and chemistry. In his position there, he taught many illustrious Cubans, including José Antonio Saco, Domingo del Monte, José de la Luz y Caballero, and Felipe Poey. Referring to Varela, De la Luz said: "As long as there is thought in Cuba, we will have to remember him, the one who taught us how to think." José Martí's teacher, Rafael María de Mendive, was also Varela's student. During this period, Varela established a literary society and published Miscelánea filosófica, a popular book on philosophy, before he was 30 years old.

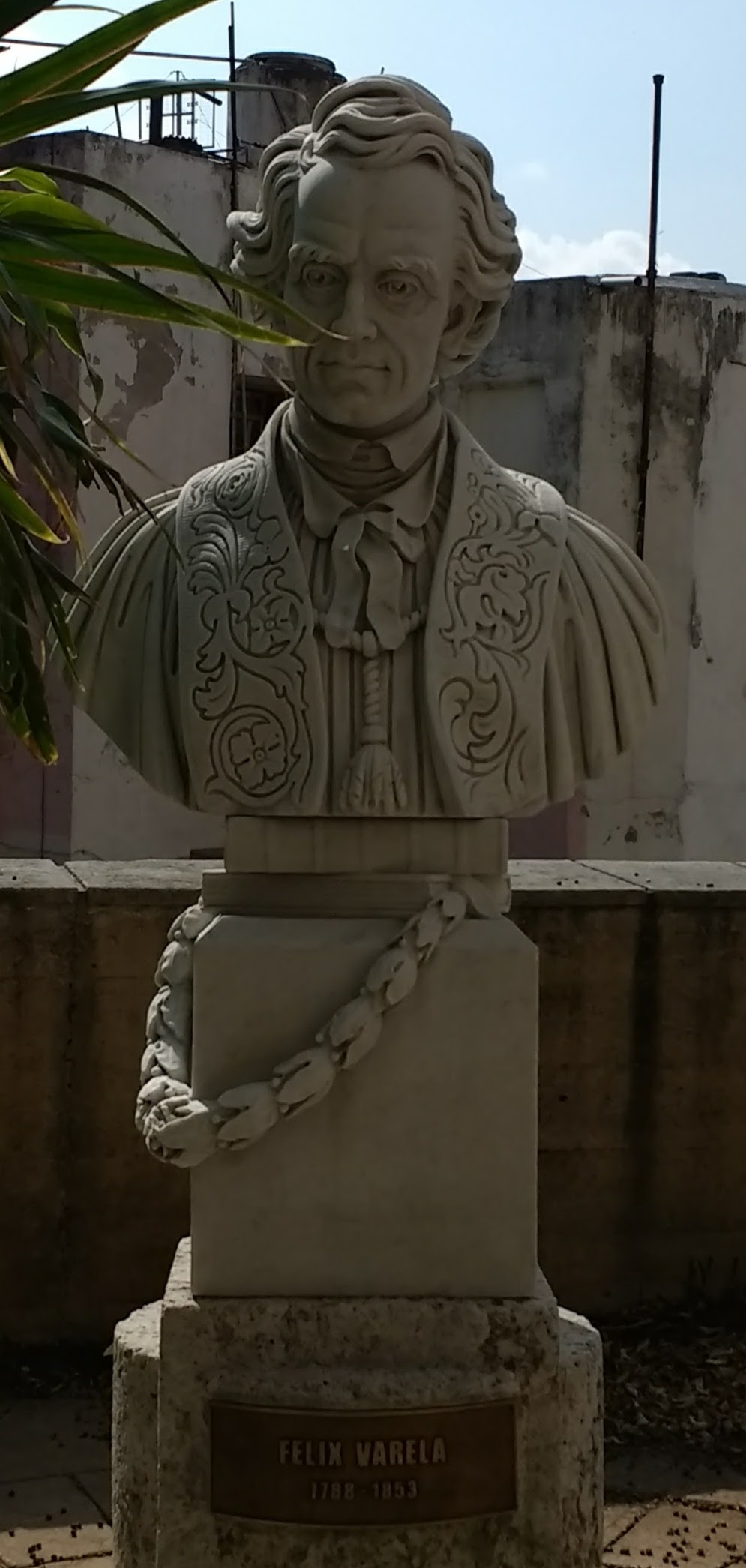
A bust of Félix Varela on the grounds of the University of Havana campus.

In 1821 Varela was chosen to represent Cuba in the Cortes Generales of Spain in Madrid, where he joined in a petition to the Crown for the independence of Latin America, and also published an essay which argued for the abolition of slavery in Cuba. For such ideas, after the 1823 Spanish Bourbon Restoration overthrew the liberal government of Spain and restored Spanish Bourbon King Ferdinand VII who then brutally suppressed all opposition, he was sentenced to death by the government. Before he could be arrested, however, he fled, first to Gibraltar, then to the United States, where he spent the rest of his life, settling in New York City.

In New York, Varela founded El Habanero, the first Spanish-language newspaper in the United States, though it produced only seven issues. He published other newspapers in Spanish, including El Mensajero Semanal, and also in English The Protestant's Abridger and Annotator. He published many articles about human rights, as well as multiple essays on religious tolerance, cooperation between the English and Spanish-speaking communities, and the importance of education.

After spending some months studying English, he served as an assistant at St. Peter's Church on Barclay Street from 1825 to 1827. In 1827, Varela purchased a former Episcopalian church building on Ann Street named Christ Church, and founded a new Catholic parish bearing the same name. By 1833, the building was beginning to become unsafe to use, and Varela therefore purchased land on James Street for the construction of a new church that would be dedicated to St. James. However, some members of the congregation complained that James Street was too far from their former church, and so in 1836 Varela also purchased a former Presbyterian church on Chambers Street, which he renamed the Church of the Transfiguration, and he served as the pastor of the church on Chambers Street for his remaining time in New York. In 1853, several years after Varela had left New York for Florida, the parish moved again to a former Protestant church building on Mott Street in the Five Points neighborhood of Manhattan. The area later became known as Chinatown and the parish continues to serve a largely immigrant community as of 2017. It houses a memorial to Varela.

In 1837, Varela was named Vicar General of the Diocese of New York, which then covered all of New York State and the northern half of New Jersey. In this post, he played a significant role in how the American Church dealt with the tremendous influx of Irish refugees, which was beginning at the time. His desire to assist those in need, coupled with his gift for languages, allowed him to master the Irish language to communicate more efficiently with many recent Irish arrivals.

Varela served as a theological consultant to the committee of American bishops, which drew up the famous Baltimore Catechism, which began a standard teaching tool for Catholic children in the nation until the mid-20th century. He was later awarded a doctorate of Theology by St. Mary's Seminary in Baltimore, Maryland.

In 1848, worn out by his labors, Varela developed severe asthma, which led him to retire to St. Augustine, dying there five years later. In 1902, Bishop William John Kenny of the Diocese of St. Augustine approved the relocation of Fr. Varela's remains. Varela's body was dis-interred from Tolomato Cemetery and returned to Cuba to be laid to rest in the University of Havana's Aula Magna.

== Honors ==
The Cuban government has created an award bearing his name, entitled the Orden Félix Varela, which is given to those whom the government deems to have contributed to Cuban and worldwide culture. (See List of people awarded the Varela award.)

His name is currently associated with a project proposed by the Christian Liberation Movement in Cuba, named Proyecto Varela, which was announced to the Cuban people on government-owned TV and radio stations in Cuba by United States President Jimmy Carter. In 1997 the United States Postal Service honored Varela by issuing a 32-cent commemorative stamp. Many in the Cuban American exile community identify with him because of his experiences.

=== Places named after Varela ===
- Felix Varela High School, opened on August 28, 2000, in Miami, Florida, United States, is dedicated to the memory of Varela.
- "Varella Avenue" in St. Augustine, Florida, is a misspelled tribute to the priest who spent his early and last years there.
- "Padre Varela" street, more commonly known by its old name of Belascoaín, is a main north–south street in Centro Habana.
- BD−17 63, a star in Cetus, was named after Varela in the 2019 NameExoWorlds contest.

== Cause for canonization ==
Currently, Varela is being considered for canonization as a Catholic saint and was declared a Servant of God, recognizing his life as a devoted Catholic and a model for others in and out of the faith, and officially beginning the process.

On Easter Sunday, April 8, 2012, both the Archdiocese of New York and the Archdiocese of Miami (each having significant Catholic Cuban-American populations) announced that the Vatican's Sacred Congregation for the Causes of Saints had declared Varela "Venerable," meaning he lived a virtuous life within the Catholic faith to a heroic degree and as such is worthy of praise (veneration).

For him to be beatified, the next stage of the process since he is not a martyr, a miracle (officially deemed to be so from a neutral theological and scientific point of view) must be proved attributable to his direct intercession. The canonization will then follow if another such miracle is declared to have occurred after the first. If canonized, he would be the first Cuban-born person to be honored on the altars of the Catholic church.

On October 30, 2015, Cardinal Jaime Ortega, Archbishop of Havana, appointed Archbishop Vincenzo Paglia as Postulator in the process for Varela's beatification and canonization. Paglia is also President of the Holy See's Pontifical Council for the Family, and served as Postulator for the process of canonization of Óscar Romero, the martyred Archbishop of San Salvador, who was canonized in 2018.
