= Villarramiel =

Coordinates: 42°03′N 4°55′W

- municipality
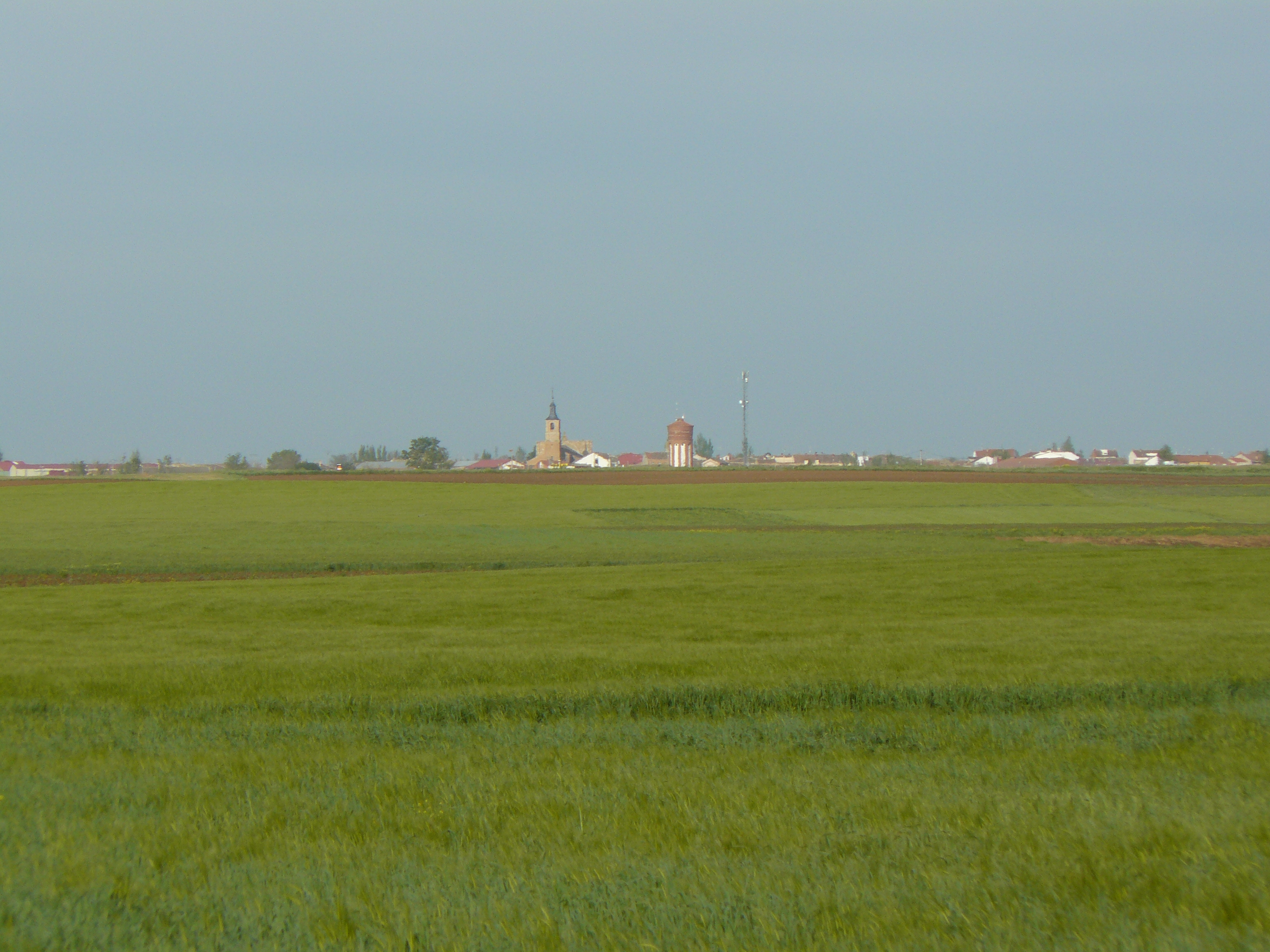

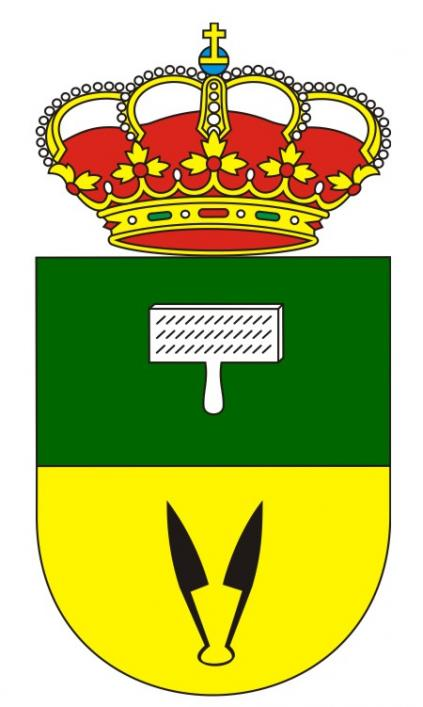
- Coat of arms
- Interactive map of Villarramiel
- Country: Spain
- Autonomous community: Castile and León
- Province: Palencia
- Municipality: Villarramiel

Area
  - Total: 30 km^{2} (12 sq mi)
- Elevation: 754 m (2,474 ft)

Population (2025-01-01)
  - Total: 782
  - Density: 26/km^{2} (68/sq mi)
- Time zone: UTC+1 (CET)
  - Summer (DST): UTC+2 (CEST)
- Website: Official website

Villarramiel is a municipality located in the province of Palencia, Castile and León, Spain. According to the 2022 census (INE), the municipality has a population of 795 inhabitants.

== History ==
Villarramiel was founded by Herramel Álvarez, son of Álvaro Herraméliz and his wife, Sancha Sánchez de Pamplona.

== Notable people ==
- Apolinar Serrano (1833–1876), Spanish bishop of Havana
