= El Habanero (newspaper) =

Cuban newspaper

- Website type: Daily newspaper
- Available in: Spanish
- Website: elhabanero.cubaweb.cu
- Launched: 1987; 39 years ago
- Current status: Online

El Habanero is a Cuban daily newspaper (except Monday). It is published in Spanish and is located in Havana. The name honors the homonymous newspaper created and published in 1824–1826 by Felix Varela (1787–1853) a Cuban patriot, priest and writer.

Current "El Habanero" was created in 1987 as the official newspaper of the La Habana province (19 municipalities surrounding Havana city). Starting from 2011 with the segmentation of La Habana Province into Artemisa and Mayabeque provinces, the printed version of "El Habanero" was closed and new newspapers were created: "El Artemiseño" and "Mayabeque", for each separate province.
