= Apolinar Serrano =

Spanish bishop

- Bishop of San Cristóbal de la Habana
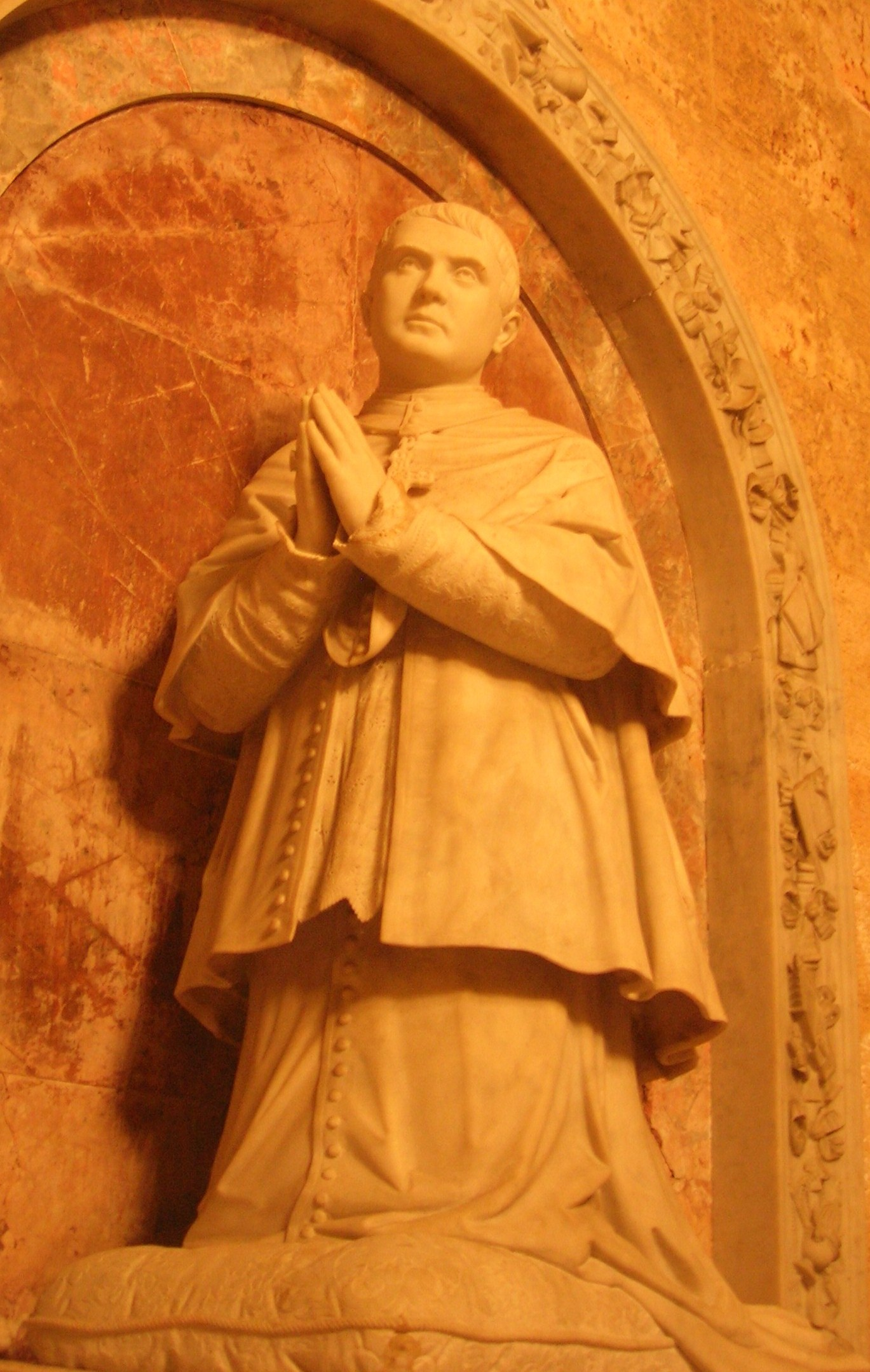
- Apolinar Serrano
- Church: Catholic Church
- Diocese: Diocese of San Cristóbal de la Habana
- In office: 23 September 1875 – 15 June 1876
- Predecessor: Jacinto María Martínez y Sáez
- Successor: Ramón Fernández Piérola y López de Luzuriaga

Orders
- Ordination: 22 December 1860
- Consecration: 21 November 1875 by Fernando Blanco y Lorenzo

Personal details
- Born: Apolinar Serrano Díez; 23 July 1833 Villarramiel de Campos, Spain
- Died: 15 June 1876 (aged 42)

Apolinar Serrano (July 23, 1833 – June 15, 1876) was a Spanish bishop of Havana.

He was born in Villarramiel, Spain. Buried in Havana Cathedral. His grave statue is a work by the Italian sculptor Pietro Costa.
