= Manuel Santander y Frutos =

Roman Catholic bishop

Mgr. Manuel Santander
- Bishop of San Cristóbal de la Habana
- Church: Roman Catholic Church
- See: Havana
- Appointed: March 17, 1887
- Term ended: November 24, 1899
- Other post: Titular Bishop of Sebastopolis (1900-07)

Orders
- Ordination: October 30, 1887
- Consecration: by Benito Sanz y Forés

Personal details
- Born: Manuel Santander y Frutos; July 4, 1835 Rueda, Valladolid, Spain
- Died: February 14, 1907 (aged 71)

Manuel Santander y Frutos (July 4, 1835 - February 14, 1907) was a Spanish monsignor of the Catholic Church who served as Bishop of Havana from 1887 to 1899.

== Early life and education ==
Manuel Santander y Frutos was born on June 4, 1835 in Rueda, Valladolid. He obtained his licentiate in Theology in 1857, and his doctorate in 1864.

== Priesthood ==
In 1859, Manuel Santander was ordained as a priest in Rueda. Having been ordained as a priest, he taught theology at the Santander Seminary in 1860 and then the Valladolid Seminary in the following years.

On March 17, 1887, he was ordained Bishop of Havana. The Roman Catholic Diocese of San Cristóbal de la Habana was governed by Santander until he resigned his bishopric on November 24, 1899, when Cuba was lost to Spain.

From 1900 until 1907, he was appointed as Titular bishop of Sebastopolis in Armenia.

== Death ==
Manuel Santander died on February 14, 1907.
