= Alfredo Petit-Vergel =

Cuban religious leader (1936–2021)

Bishop Alfredo Víctor Petit-Vergel
- Born: 24 July 1936; Havana, Cuba
- Died: 7 August 2021 (aged 85); Havana, Cuba

Alfredo Víctor Petit-Vergel (24 July 1936 – 7 August 2021) was a Cuban Roman Catholic prelate, who served as the Titular Bishop of Buslacena and the Auxiliary Bishop of the Archdiocese of Havana.

He started his studies at El Buen Pastor Seminary in Havana and then finished his religious studies in Rome at the Pontifical Gregorian University.

He was ordained a priest on 23 December 1961, in Rome. When he returned to Havana he was assigned to the parish of Sagrado Corazon (Sacred Heart) in Vedado, then the parish of Salvador del Mundo in El Cerro. He was a professor at the San Carlos and San Ambrosio Seminary and assigned to the parish of San Francisco de Paula and chaplain of the San Francisco de Paula Hospital. He spoke Spanish, Italian, French, English, and German.

He was appointed Titular Bishop of Buslacena and the Auxiliary Bishop of the Archdiocese of Havana by Pope John Paul II on 16 November 1991. He was consecrated a bishop on 12 January 1992, in the Cathedral of Havana by Mons. Jaime Lucas Ortega y Alamino Archbishop of Havana, assisted by Mons. Faustino Sainz Muñoz Pro-Nuncio in Cuba and Mons. Pedro Claro Meurice-Estíu, Archbishop of the Archdiocese of Santiago de Cuba.
