= Alberto Martín y Villaverde =

Bishop Alberto Martín y Villaverde
- Born: May 2, 1904; Havana, Cuba
- Died: November 3, 1960 (aged 56); Matanzas, Cuba

Bishop Juan Alberto de la Merced Martín y Villaverde (2 May 1904 – 3 November 1960) was Bishop of the Roman Catholic Diocese of Matanzas (1938–1960).

Bishop Martin was ordained a priest on October 27, 1927. He was appointed bishop of the Diocese of Matanzas by Pope Pius XI on May 14, 1938, and was consecrated in the Cathedral of Matanzas on July 3, 1938, when he was 34 years old. His principal consecrator was Archbishop José Manuel Dámaso Rúiz y Rodríguez of the Archdiocese of Havana and as co-consecrators, Archbishop Enrique Pérez Serantes of the Archdiocese of Santiago de Cuba and Bishop Eduardo Pedro Martínez y Dalmau, C.P. of the Diocese of Cienfuegos. Bishop Martin died on November 3, 1960, at the age of 56.
