= Evelio Díaz-Cía =

Cuban archbishop (1902–1984)

- Archbishop of San Cristóbal de la Habana
- Native name: Evelio Díaz y Cía
- Church: Catholic Church
- Archdiocese: Archdiocese of San Cristóbal de la Habana
- In office: 20 March 1963 – 26 January 1970
- Predecessor: Manuel Arteaga y Betancourt
- Successor: Francisco Oves-Fernandez
- Other post: Titular Archbishop of Celene (1970)
- Previous posts: Titular Archbishop of Petra in Palaestina (1959-1963); Coadjutor Archbishop of San Cristóbal de la Habana (1959-1963); Titular Bishop of Lamdia (1959); Auxiliary Bishop of San Cristóbal de la Habana (1959); Bishop of Pinar del Río (1941-1959)

Orders
- Ordination: 12 September 1926 by Pedro Ladislao González y Estrada
- Consecration: 1 March 1942 by George J. Caruana

Personal details
- Born: 17 February 1902 San Cristóbal, Pinar del Río Province, U.S.-occupied Cuba
- Died: 21 July 1984 (aged 82) Havana, Cuba

Evelio Diaz-Cia (17 February 1902 in San Cristóbal, Pinar del Río, Cuba – 21 July 1984 in Havana, Cuba) was the Archbishop of the Archdiocese of Havana.

His parents were Arturo Díaz-Díaz and Francisca Cía-López. He was baptised at his parish church in San Cristobal on 7 February 1903, by Father Marcelino Herrero-de Dios (Registered in Box 19 of Baptisms, Folio 387, number 1260). He completed his religious studies at the San Carlos and San Ambrosio Seminary.

He was ordained a priest on 12 September 1926, and was named Chaplain of the Cathedral of Havana. On 18 June 1927, he was assigned to the Parish of Nuestra Señora de Montserrate. On 2 April 1940, named Chaplain to the Ursulines Sisters. On 10 September 1935, he was named Professor of Church History and Sociology at the San Carlos y San Ambrosio Seminary. He was assigned to the parish of Santo Ángel on 15 February 1939, and on 11 April 1940, he was named Vice-Rector of the Seminary and six days after that Chaplain of the Sagrado Corazón de Tejadillo.

Diaz-Cia was elevated to Bishop of Pinar del Río on 26 December 1941, by Pope Pius XII. He was consecrated on 1 March 1942, in the Cathedral of Pinar del Río by Mons. Giorgio Caruana, Titular Archbishop of Sebaste, Apostolic Nuncio of Cuba and assisted by Mons. Enrique Pérez-Serantes, Bishop of Camagüey and by Mons. Alberto Martín y Villaverde, Bishop of Matanzas. In 1958 he wrote the famous "Oración por la Paz" (Prayer for Peace). He was named Titular Bishop of Lamdia and named Auxiliary Bishop of Cardinal Manuel Arteaga-Betancourt, Archbishop of Havana and Apostolic Administrator ad nutum Sanctae Sedis on 21 March 1959. On that same date he was named Apostolic Administrator of Pinar del Río and remained in that position until 16 January 1960, when Mons. Manuel Rodriguez-Rozas was named Bishop of Pinar del Río. On 31 May 1959, he declared his approval of the agrarian Reforms in the magazine Bohemia without knowing how it was to be implemented. Promoted to Titular Archbishop of Petra di Palestina and named Coadjutor sedis datus of Havana on 14 November 1959. He participated in the National Catholic Congress held in Havana on 28–29 November 1959. He was arrested and held for a few days in April 1961 during the Bay of Pigs Invasion.

On 4 August 1961, Diaz-Cia was given the right of succession to the Archdiocese of Havana. He succeeded as Archbishop of Havana on 21 March 1963, upon the death of Cardinal Arteaga. On 10 April 1969, he was pressured to sign a document asking for the ending of the U.S. economic blockade against Cuba. He resigned his office of Archbishop of Havana and took the title of Titular Archbishop of Celene on 26 January 1970. He was succeeded by Mons. Francisco Ricardo Oves-Fernandez, Titular Bishop of Montecorvino and Auxiliary Bishop of the Diocese of Cienfuegos. Diaz-Cia renounced his titular see and assumed the title of Archbishop Emeritus of the Archdiocese of Havana on 26 December 1970.

He died on 21 July 1984, in Havana. His funeral was held at the Cathedral of Havana and he is buried in the Colon Cemetery. In his funeral procession was the Pro Nuncio in Cuba, Mons. Giulio Einaudi and the members of the Conferencia Episcopal Cubana were present.

Catholic Church titles
| Preceded by Manuel Arteaga y Betancourt | Archbishop of San Cristóbal de la Habana; 1963–1970 | Succeeded by Francisco Oves-Fernandez |
