= Manuel Arteaga y Betancourt =

20th-century Catholic cardinal and archbishop

His Eminence Manuel Arteaga y Betancourt
- Cardinal, Archbishop of San Cristóbal de la Habana
- See: Havana
- Appointed: 26 December 1941
- Predecessor: José Manuel Dámaso Rúiz y Rodríguez
- Successor: Evelio Díaz-Cía

Orders
- Created cardinal: 18 February 1946

Personal details
- Born: 28 December 1879 Camagüey, Cuba
- Died: 20 March 1963 (aged 83) Havana, Cuba
- Coat of arms

Styles of Manuel Arteaga y Betancourt
- Reference style: His Eminence
- Spoken style: Your Eminence
- Religious style: Cardinal
- Informal style: Cardinal
- See: Havana

Manuel Arteaga y Betancourt (December 28, 1879 – March 20, 1963) was a Cuban prelate of the Catholic Church who served as Archbishop of Havana from 1941 to 1963. He raised to the rank of cardinal in 1946.

== Biography ==
He was born in Camagüey, Cuba, to Rosendo Arteaga Montejo and his wife Delia Betancourt Guerra. Baptized Manuel Francisco del Corazon de Jesus on April 17, 1880, by Father Vigilio Arteaga, he was confirmed by Archbishop José María Martín de Herrera y de la Iglesia on November 17, 1882. His paternal uncle, the priest Ricardo Arteaga Montejo, who had emigrated to Venezuela for political reasons, took Manuel there in 1892.

Arteaga obtained his bachelor's in philosophy on June 15, 1898, from Universidad Central de Venezuela, and entered a Capuchin convent in Caracas in 1900. For reasons of health, he left the convent and entered the Seminary of Santa Rosa de Lima in Caracas on April 12, 1901.

Arteaga was ordained to the priesthood by Archbishop Juan Bautista Castro of Caracas on April 17, 1904. He did pastoral work in Cumaná, Venezuela, from 1906 to 1912, and then in Camagüey until 1915. Arteaga was named provisor and vicar general of the Archdiocese of Havana 1915 and became Canon Schoolmaster in 1916. He was raised to the rank of Domestic Prelate of His Holiness on May 31, 1926, and Vicar Capitular of Havana on January 3, 1940.

On December 28, 1941, Pope Pius appointed him Archbishop of Havana. He received his episcopal consecration on February 24, 1942, from Archbishop Giorgio Caruana, the Apostolic Nuncio to Cuba, with Archbishop Manuel Zubizarreta y Unamunsaga OCD and Bishop Eduardo Martínez y Dalmau CP serving as co-consecrators.

Pope Pius XII made him cardinal priest of San Lorenzo in Lucina in the consistory of February 18, 1946; he was the first Cuban member of the College of Cardinals.

Arteaga suffered a wound to his forehead in August 1953, reported by the censored press as the result of a fall in his residence, and required twenty stitches. In a pastoral letter that September, he explained that his injury was "a common criminal attempt" by a group of strangers, putting to rest the suspicions that he had been pistol-whipped by government agents who were searching his residence for hidden revolutionaries or weapons.

His gravesite taken in August 2007

He was one of the cardinal electors who participated in the 1958 papal conclave, which elected Pope John XXIII. Persecuted by the Communist regime of Fidel Castro, he took refuge in the Argentine embassy and nunciature of the Holy See in 1961 and 1962, when he was hospitalized at San Juan de Dios Hospital in Havana.

Arteaga died at that hospital on March 20, 1963, at the age of 83. He is buried in the Colon Cemetery.

== Trivia ==
- Arteaga was a proponent of Cuban dictator Fulgencio Batista, whom he and other laypersons congratulated on taking power
- He vehemently disapproved of tight and low-cut women's fashions, even forbidding such attire at weddings under pain of the ceremony's suspension.

Catholic Church titles
Preceded by José Manuel Dámaso Rúiz y Rodríguez	Archbishop of San Cristóbal de la Habana; 1941 – 1963	Succeeded by Evelio Díaz-Cía
