= San Carlos and San Ambrosio Seminary =

Seminary in Havana, Cuba

Coordinates: 23.1418°N 82.3519°W

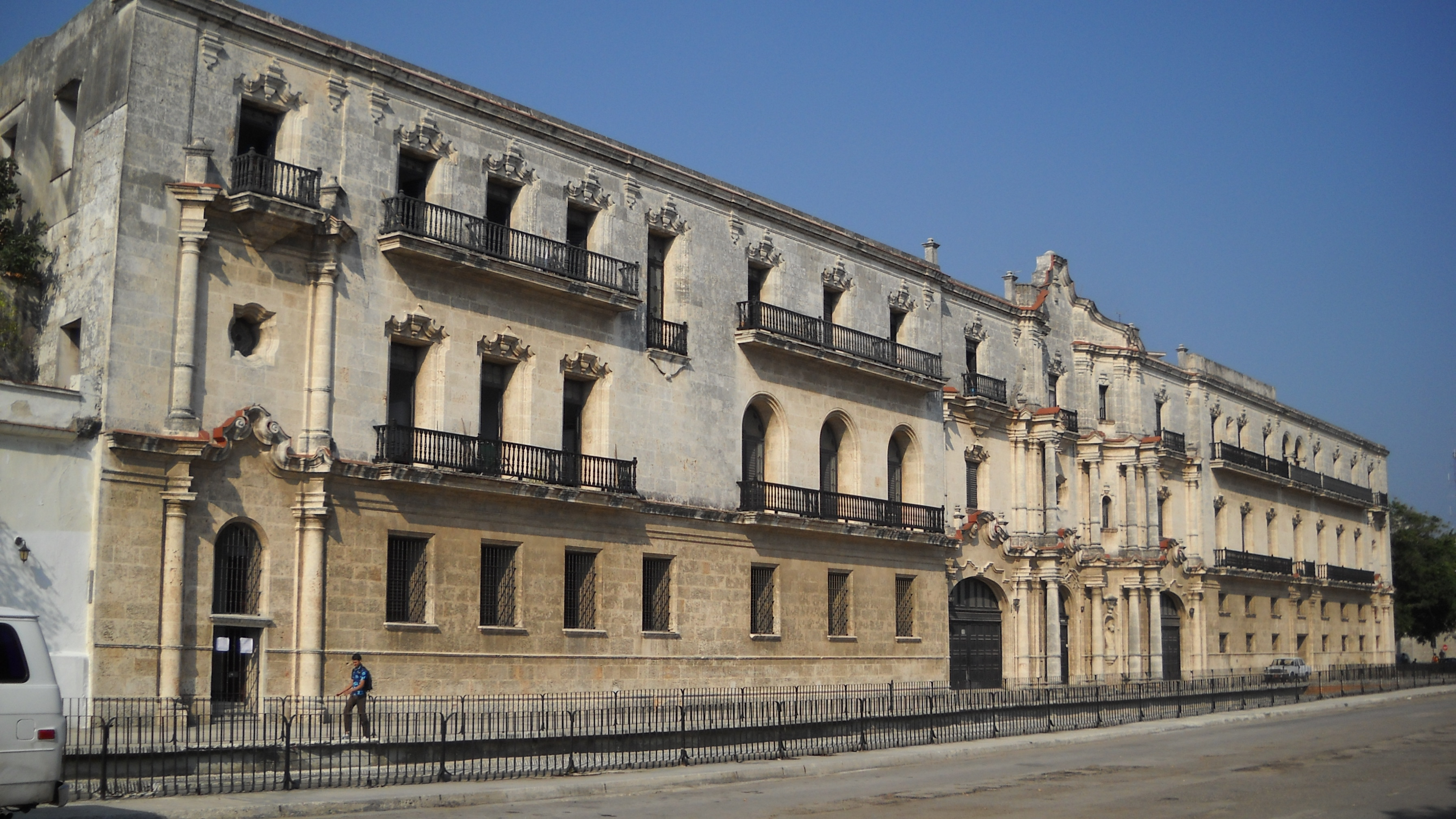
- San Carlos and San Ambrosio Seminary
- Type: Private Roman Catholic seminary
- Established: 1689
- Affiliations: Archdiocese of Havana
- Rector: Antonio Diego Hernández, sacerdote operario diocesano
- Administrative staff: San Carlo5 and San Ambrosio Seminary
- Location: Havana, Cuba

San Carlos and San Ambrosio Seminary (Spanish: Seminario de San Carlos y San Ambrosio) is a seminary in Havana, Cuba.

== Building ==
As a training center where prestigious Cuban intellectuals were educated before the foundation of the University of Havana, it was one of the most important buildings during the colonial period.

The center courtyard is the only one of its kind in Cuba: it has galleries on three levels, the first with simple columns, the second with double columns, and the third with plain wooden piers. It still operates as a seminary.

The old porch, the courtyard and the main stairway, one of the most splendid of colonial times, stand out preserved among Havana's religious architecture. The original baroque porch has sculptures, pilasters and chamfered angles. However, only the front was redesigned to face the bay in 1950. The current entrance was designed following the cathedral's baroque motifs.

== History ==
This architectural work has its origin in the modest San Ambrosio School, which in 1689 was established by the Bishop of Havana, Diego Evelio de Compostela, in a house next to his on Compostela street (named after this bishop). so that poor men with a religious vocation could study there.

The old building, home to the Conciliar Seminary of San Carlos and San Ambrosio, began to be built in the year 1700 by members of the Society of Jesus, and was completed in 1767, before the Jesuits were expelled from the Spanish Empire.

However, the building did not reach its current shape until Bishop Juan José Díaz de Espada added constructive forms that rivaled the gates of the University of Valladolid. During this period, the seminary achieved such scientific renown that not even the Royal and Pontifical University of San Gerónimo de la Habana could shadow it.

The building would later become, for a few years, the seat of the Archbishopric of Havana under the cardinal figure of the Archbishop of Havana Manuel Arteaga to, later, return to being the Conciliar Seminary of San Carlos and San Ambrosio, currently it is an office center of the catholic church.

== Illustrious Students ==
During these years of the Bishop of Espada, the eminent priest Félix Varela y Morales studied at the Seminary, who was one of the first to perceive and teach to see Cuba as a nation, and representative of the Island of Cuba in the General Courts of Spain in 1821, where he advocated for the just causes of Cuba and demanded freedom for the slaves.

The Cuban José Antonio Saco, sociologist, historian and economist, who stood out for his strong opposition to slavery and against the annexation of Cuba to the United States, also studied at this eminent Conciliar Seminary.

== Notable students and professors ==
- Félix Varela
- Eduardo Boza-Masvidal
- Braulio Orue-Vivanco
- Alfredo Llaguno-Canals
- Alfredo Petit-Vergel
- Evelio Díaz-Cía
- Jaime Lucas Ortega y Alamino
- Jorge Enrique Serpa Pérez

== See also ==
- List of buildings in Havana
