= Archdiocese of San Cristóbal de la Habana =

Latin Catholic archdiocese in Cuba

Coordinates: 23.1414°N 82.3519°W

Metropolitan Archdiocese of San Cristóbal de la Habana Archidioecesis Metropolitae Avanensis
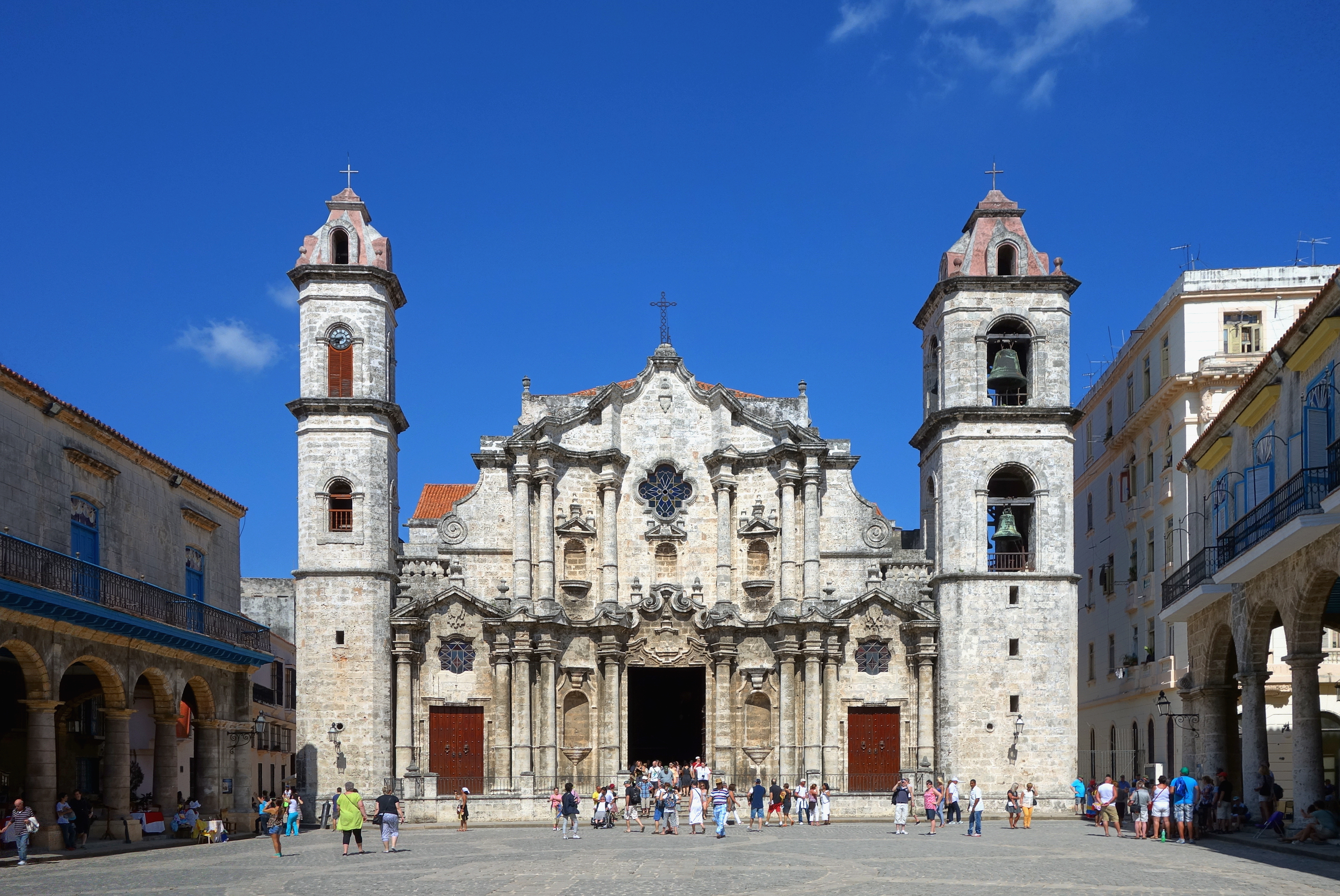
- Catedral de San Cristóbal

Location
- Country: Cuba
- Ecclesiastical province: San Cristóbal de la Habana

Statistics
- Area: 7,542 km^{2} (2,912 sq mi)
- Population: Total; Catholics: (as of 2012); 3,930,000; 2,822,000 (71.8%)
- Parishes: 85

Information
- Denomination: Catholic Church
- Sui iuris church: Latin Church
- Rite: Roman Rite
- Established: 10 September 1787 (239 years ago)
- Cathedral: Cathedral of St. Christopher

Current leadership
- Pope: Leo XIV
- Metropolitan Archbishop: Juan García Rodríguez
- Auxiliary Bishops: Eloy Ricardo Domínguez Martínez

Map

The Archdiocese of San Cristóbal de la Habana (Spanish: Arquidiócesis de San Cristóbal de la Habana, Latin: Archidioecesis Avanensis) is one of three Catholic archdioceses in Cuba.

== History ==
The diocese was erected on 10 September 1787 by Pope Pius VI, from the territory of the then–Diocese of Santiago de Cuba. When it was erected, the new diocese encompassed the secular provinces of Santa Clara, Matanzas, Havana, and Pinar del Río in Cuba and Florida and Louisiana in what is now the United States of America. On 25 April 1793 the diocese lost territory for what would be the first of four territorial losses when the Diocese of Louisiana and the Two Floridas (Saint Louis of New Orleans) was erected. The diocese again lost territory on 20 February 1903 when the dioceses of Pinar del Río and Cienfuegos were erected, and then again on 10 December 1912 upon the erection of the diocese of Matanzas. Eventually the diocese was elevated to the Metropolitan See of Sancti Christophori de Habana, San Cristobal de la Habana on 6 January 1925.

Pope Francis accepted the resignation of Cardinal Jaime Lucas Ortega y Alamino as Archbishop of Havana on 26 April 2016. The archdiocese had one auxiliary bishop, Juan de Dios Hernández-Ruiz, SJ, who was appointed Bishop of Pinar del Rio in 2019.

The archdiocese encompasses 7,542 square kilometres (2,912 sq mi) and has two suffragan dioceses, Matanzas and Pinar del Río. According to a 2004 estimate, there were a total of 3.9 million people living within the confines of the diocese, 71.8% or 2.8 million of whom were Catholic. There were 49 diocesan priests and 62 religious priests, totaling 111 priests serving the faithful of the diocese. With these figures, there were approximately 25,225 Catholics per priest. There were 23 permanent deacons and 79 male and 348 female religious. In 2004, there were 102 established parishes.

== Ordinaries of San Cristobal de la Habana ==
- Felipe José de Tres-Palacios y Verdeja † (30 March 1789 Appointed – 16 September 1799 Died)
- Juan José Díaz de Espada y Fernánez de Landa † (11 August 1800 Appointed – 12 August 1832 Died)
- Francisco Fleix Soláus † (14 January 1846 Appointed – 22 September 1864 Appointed, Archbishop of Tarragona)
- Jacinto Maria Martínez y Sáez, OFMCap † (27 March 1865 Appointed – 31 October 1873 Died)
- Apolinar Serrano y Díaz † (23 September 1875 Appointed – 15 June 1876 Died)
- Ramón Fernández Piérola y Lopez de Luzuriaga † (4 September 1879 Appointed – 17 March 1887 Appointed, bishop of Ávila)
- Manuel Santander y Frutos † (17 March 1887 Appointed – 24 November 1899 Resigned)
- Donato Sbarretti † (9 January 1900 Appointed – 16 September 1901 Appointed, Titular Archbishop of Gortyna)
- Pedro Ladislao González y Estrada † (16 September 1903 Appointed – 3 January 1925 Resigned)
- José Manuel Dámaso Rúiz y Rodríguez † (30 March 1925 Appointed – 3 January 1940 Died)
- Manuel Arteaga y Betancourt † (28 December 1941 Appointed – 20 March 1963 Died); elevated to Cardinal in 1946
- Evelio Diaz-Cia † (21 March 1963 Succeeded – 26 January 1970 Resigned)
- Francisco Ricardo Oves-Fernandez † (26 January 1970 Appointed – 28 March 1981 Resigned)
- Jaime Lucas Ortega y Alamino † (21 November 1981 Appointed – 26 April 2016 Resigned); elevated to Cardinal in 1994
- Juan García Rodríguez (26 April 2016 Appointed - ); elevated to Cardinal in 2019

== Affiliated and Auxiliary Bishops of the Archdiocese ==
- Fernando Azcárate y Freyre de Andrade, S.J. † (Auxiliary Bishop: 17 March 1964 to 26 January 1970)
- Carlos Jesús Patricio Baladrón Valdés (Auxiliary Bishop: 16 November 1991 to 24 January 1998)
- Francisco de Paula Barnada y Aguilar † (Priest: 11 April 1858 to 2 June 1899)
- Eduardo Tomas Boza-Masvidal † (Priest: 28 February 1944; Auxiliary Bishop: 31 March 1960 to 21 March 1963)
- Bonaventure Broderick † (Auxiliary Bishop: 7 September 1903; Coadjutor Bishop: 9 November 1903 to 1 March 1905)
- Francisco Ramón Valentín de Casaus y Torres, OP † (Apostolic Administrator: 24 February 1836 to 10 November 1845)
- Juan José Díaz de Espada y Fernánez de Landa † (Bishop: 11 August 1800 to 12 August 1832)
- Evelio Diaz-Cia † (Priest: 12 September 1926 to 26 December 1941; Auxiliary Bishop: 21 March 1959; Coadjutor Archbishop: 14 November 1959; Archbishop: 21 March 1963 to 26 January 1970)
- José Maximino Eusebio Domínguez y Rodríguez † (Priest: 13 June 1943; Auxiliary Bishop: 31 March 1960 to 18 July 1961)
- Ramón Fernández Piérola y Lopez de Luzuriaca † (Bishop: 4 September 1879 to 17 March 1887)
- Francisco Fleix Soláus † (Bishop: 14 January 1846 to 22 September 1864)
- José González de Cándamo y Cauniego † (Auxiliary Bishop: 3 July 1798 to 12 September 1801)
- Pedro Ladislao González y Estrada † (Bishop: 16 September 1903 to 3 January 1925)
- Juan de Dios Hernández-Ruiz, S.J. (Auxiliary Bishop: 3 December 2005 to 5 June 2019)
- Alfredo Llaguno-Canals † (Priest: 28 October 1928; Auxiliary Bishop: 17 March 1964 to 26 January 1970)
- Jacinto Maria Martínez y Sáez, OFMCap † (Bishop: 27 March 1865 to 31 October 1873)
- Alfredo Antonio Francisco Müller y San Martín † (Priest: 21 August 1927; Auxiliary Bishop: 13 March 1948 to 7 April 1961)
- Jaime Lucas Ortega y Alamino (Archbishop: 21 November 1981 – )
- Braulio Orue-Vivanco † (Priest: 19 May 1867 to 20 February 1903)
- Francisco Ricardo Oves-Fernandez † (Archbishop: 26 January 1970 to 28 March 1981)
- Alfredo Petit-Vergel (Priest: 23 December 1961; Auxiliary Bishop: 16 November 1991 to 26 April 2016)
- Fernando Ramon Prego Casal † (Priest: 17 April 1955 to 13 November 1970)
- Evelio Ramos-Diaz † (Priest: 11 July 1948; Auxiliary Bishop: 26 October 1970 to 25 November 1976)
- Salvador Emilio Riverón Cortina † (Priest: 3 March 1982; Auxiliary Bishop: 24 April 1999 to 22 February 2004)
- Manuel Pedro (Antonio) Rodríguez Rozas † (Priest: 31 May 1935 to 16 January 1960)
- José Manuel Dámaso Rúiz y Rodríguez † (Priest: 18 December 1897 to 18 April 1907; Archbishop: 30 March 1925 to 3 January 1940)
- Severiano Sainz y Bencamo † (Priest: 23 December 1898 to 11 February 1915)
- Manuel Santander y Frutos † (Bishop: 17 March 1887 to 24 November 1899)
- Donato Raffaele Sbarretti Tazza † (Bishop: 9 January 1900 to 16 September 1901)
- Jorge Enrique Serpa Pérez (Priest: 14 July 1968 to 13 December 2006)
- Apolinar Serrano y Díaz † (Bishop: 23 September 1875 to 15 June 1876)
- Francisco Antonio Pablo Sieni Flannings, OFMCap † (Auxiliary Bishop: 10 September 1787 to 23 November 1793)
- Felipe José de Tres-Palacios y Verdeja † (Bishop: 30 March 1789 to 16 September 1799)
- Mariano Vivanco Valiente † (Priest: 28 May 1961 to 18 May 1987)

== Churches ==
- Catedral de San Cristóbal de La Habana - Empedrado, entre San Ignacio y Mercaderes, Habana Vieja
- Iglesia Santo Cristo del Buen Viaje, Havana
- Iglesia del Espirito Santo - Calle Acosta #161, Habana Vieja
- Iglesia de Jesus del Monte - Calzada de Jesus del Monte, esquina a Quiroga
- Iglesia de Jesus, Maria y Jose - Jesus Maria y Revillagigedo, Habana Vieja
- Iglesia de los Quemados de Marianao - Real y Boquete, Marianao
- Iglesia de Nuestra Senora de la Caridad - Salud y Manrique
- Iglesia de Nuestra Senora del Carmen - Infanta esquina a Neptuno
- Iglesia de Nuestra Senora de Monserrate
- Iglesia de Nuestra Senora del Pilar
- Iglesia del Salvador del Cerro
- Iglesia de San Agustin - Calle 13 entre 12 y 14, Almendares
- Iglesia de San Francisco de Paula
- Iglesia de San Nicolas
- Iglesia del Santo Angel Custodio
- Iglesia del Santo Cristo
- Iglesia de Vedado
- Iglesia Antigua de la Loma del Carmelo
- Iglesia de Nuestra Senora de las Mercedes
- Iglesia de los Padres Pasionistas
- Iglesia de los Padres Redentoristas
- Iglesia del Sagrado Corazon de Jesus
- Iglesia de San Francisco
- Iglesia de San Juan de Latran
- Iglesia de la Santa Cruz de Jerusalen
- Iglesia de Santa Rita
- Iglesia de Santo Tomas de Villanueva
- Iglesia de San Antonio de Padua
- Iglesia de Jesus de Miramar - 5ta Avenida esquina a 82, Miramar
- Iglesia de Corpus Christi
