= Havana Cathedral =

Catholic cathedral in Cuba

Catedral de San Cristóbal
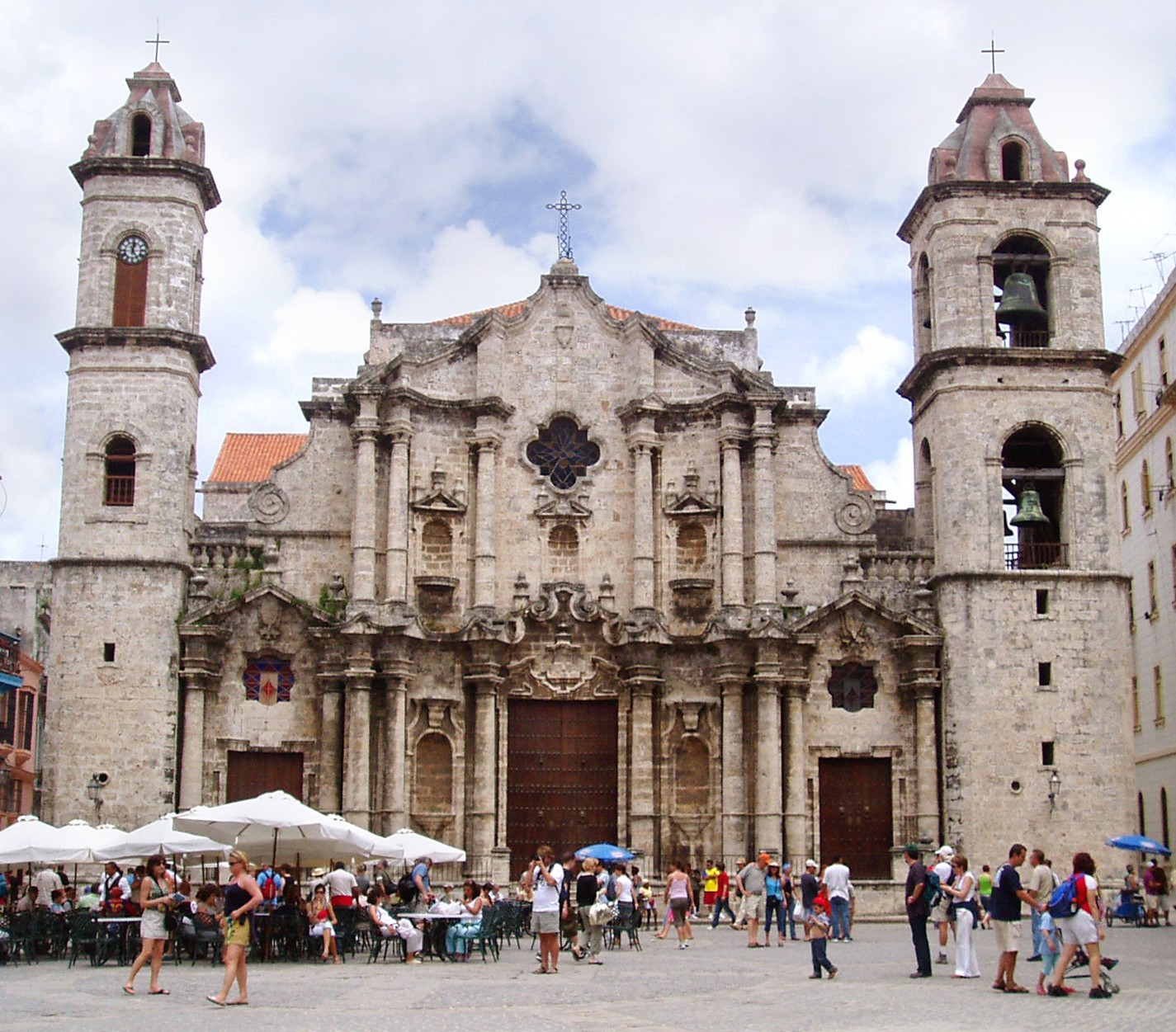
- Catedral de San Cristóbal

General information
- Type: Religious
- Architectural style: Baroque
- Location: 156 Empedrado, Havana, Cuba
- Groundbreaking: 1748
- Completed: 1777

Technical details
- Structural system: Load bearing
- Material: Coral stone
- Floor count: 1

Website
- https://arquidiocesisdelahabana.org/nueva//

Havana Cathedral (Catedral de la Purísima Concepción de María) is one of eleven Catholic cathedrals on the island. It is located in the Plaza de la Catedral on Calle Empedrado, between San Ignacio y Mercaderes, Old Havana, Havana, Cuba. The thirty by forty-nine meters rectangular church serves as the seat of the Archdiocese of San Cristóbal de la Habana. Christopher Columbus’s remains were kept in the cathedral between 1796 and 1898 before they were taken to Seville Cathedral.

It was built between 1748 and 1777 and was consecrated in 1782.

== History ==
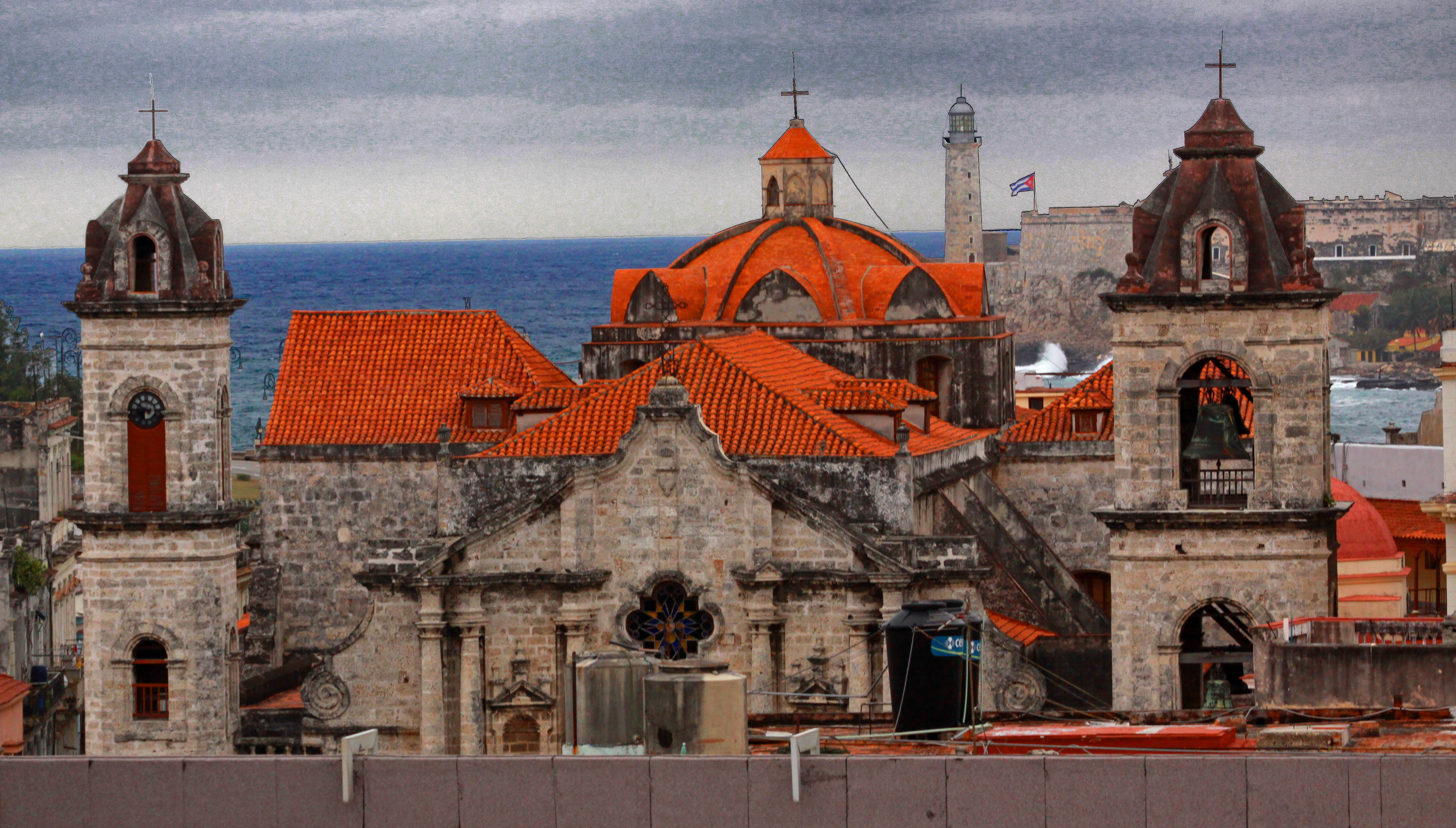
Roof and dome

The largest missionary group in Havana was the Society of Jesus. After extensive petitioning and the purchase of a piece of land in the Plaza by Diego Evelino Hurtado de Compostela, Bishop of Santiago de Cuba, a permit was granted. The cathedral is set in the former Plaza de La Ciénaga. In 1727 plans to build a church, convent and collegium were approved and the project began to take form. The plaza is located on the site of a swamp that was drained and used as a naval dockyard before the cathedral was built. The Jesuits began construction of the cathedral in 1748 on the site of an earlier church and it was completed in 1777, well after King Charles III of Spain expelled the Jesuits from the island in 1767. The cathedral once held remains of Christopher Columbus. (Note: Christopher Columbus’ remains were kept in the cathedral from 1796 to 1898 when they were transferred to Seville Cathedral.)

In 1796, after the Peace of Basel was signed and Spain ceded most of Hispaniola to France, the remains of Columbus were moved and laid to rest in the Havana Cathedral's Altar of the Gospel. The gravestone read: Oh Remains and Image of Great Columbus, Be Preserved One Thousand Years in the Funerary Urn. The remains were returned to Spain in 1898 after the Cuban War of Independence.

In the early 19th century, the baroque altars were replaced by neoclassical ones, urged by Bishop Espada, a fervent admirer of Neoclassicism and the original wood ceilings were plastered over.

== Architecture ==
Havana Cathedral Floor Plan

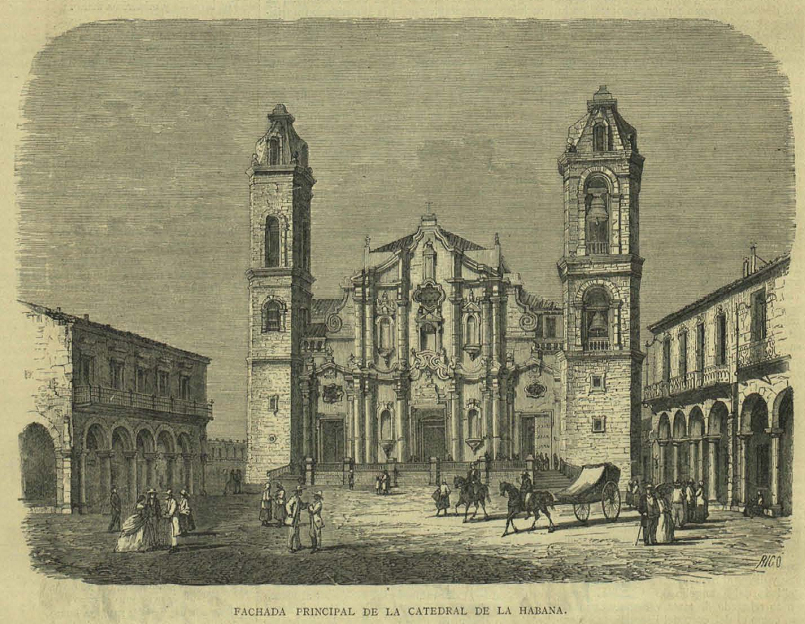
Engraving of the cathedral published in 1882 in La Ilustración Católica.

The cathedral's Baroque front elevation has asymmetrical bell towers the details of the facade are similar to those of the San Carlos and San Ambrosio Seminary which is part of the same ecclesiastical complex. One can see fossilized marine fauna and flora in the stone walls as the cathedral is, as many buildings in Havana are, constructed out of blocks of coral. (Note: Many buildings in Havana are constructed out of coral stone including the Colegio Nacional de Arquitectos de Cuba, the promenade of El Prado, and the San Carlos and San Ambrosio Seminary. Some of the exterior walls on the ground floor of the FOCSA Building of 1956 are covered with 12"x12" coral tiles.) It has a central nave, two side aisles and eight side chapels. The central arches of the nave are buttressed by eight stone flying arches located above the side aisles on the exterior of the cathedral as can be seen in the section. The flying arches, the dome over the transept or the orange roof tiles cannot be seen from the square. The width of the central nave is fifteen meters. The plan forms a Latin cross.

== Artworks ==
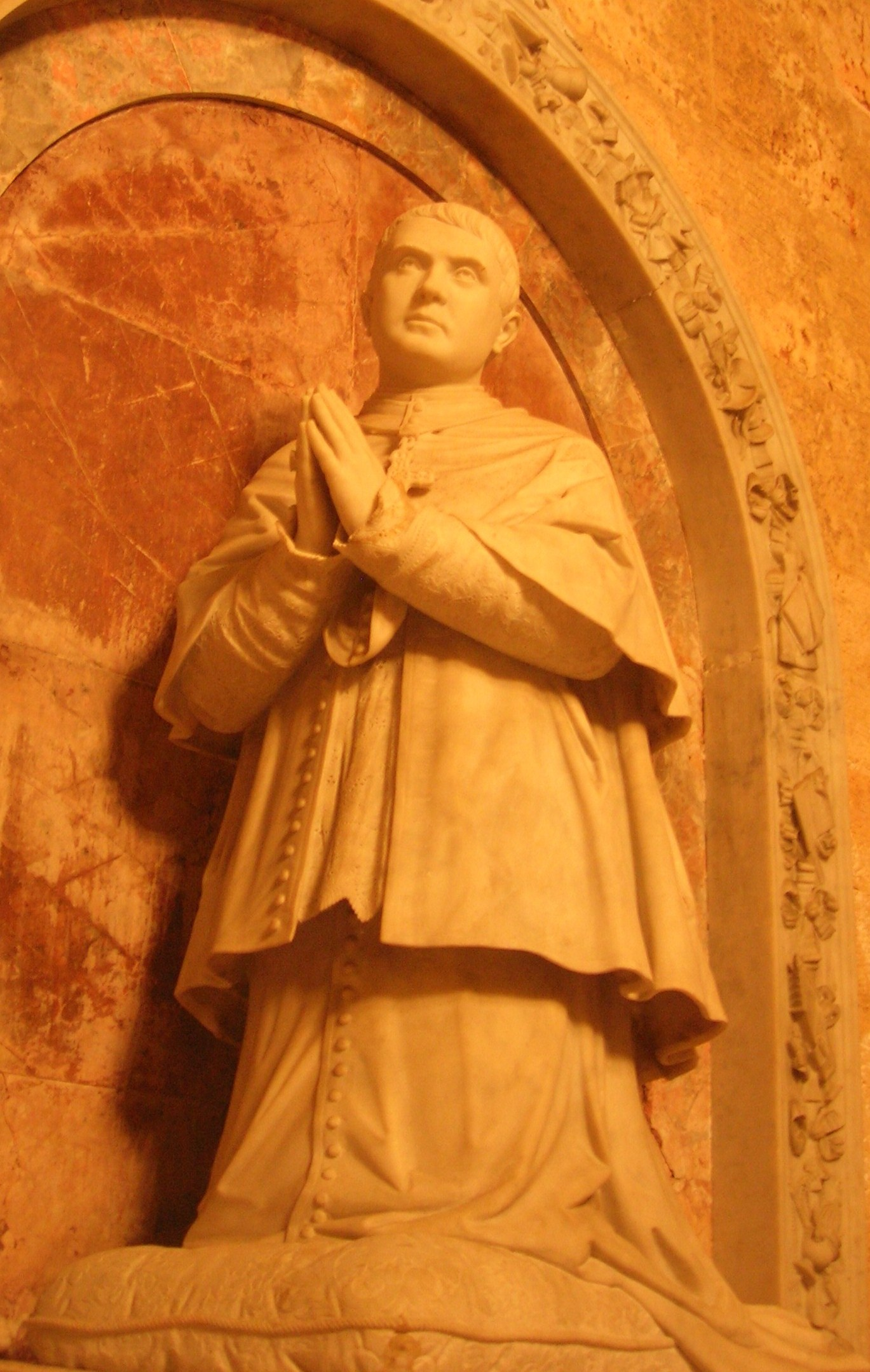
Apolinar Serrano by the Italian sculptor Pietro Costa.

The cathedral contains a number of sculptures, paintings and frescoes. There is a statute of Apolinar Serrano (July 23, 1833 – June 15, 1876) who was a Spanish bishop of Havana and was buried in the cathedral. Copies of paintings in the side chapels by Rubens and Murillo on the altars. There is a sculpture of Saint Christopher, Patron Saint of Havana, which dates from 1632 and was made by Martín de Andújar Cantos in Seville, Spain. Above the altar are three fading frescoes by Italian artist Giuseppe Perovani, a neoclassical artist who was commissioned by Bishop Juan José Díaz de Espada y Fernánez de Landa of the Roman Catholic Archdiocese of San Cristóbal de la Habana to paint three scenes: The Delivery of the Keys, The Last Supper and The Ascension. There is also the canvas of the Virgin of the Immaculate Conception, Patroness of the cathedral. Perovani was also the author of the canvas of the orange chapel (color of the ceiling) of the Virgin of Loreto, blessed by Bishop Morell de Santa Cruz in 1755. On the altar are sculptures and goldsmith works made in Rome during the first half of the 19th century. On the walls the oil paintings painted by the Frenchman Jean Baptiste Vermay, founder and first director of the Academy of Painting and Drawing of San Alejandro, the same creator of the interior works of the El Templete, in the original enclave of the city.

The cathedral stands within the area of Old Havana that UNESCO designated a World Heritage Site in 1982.

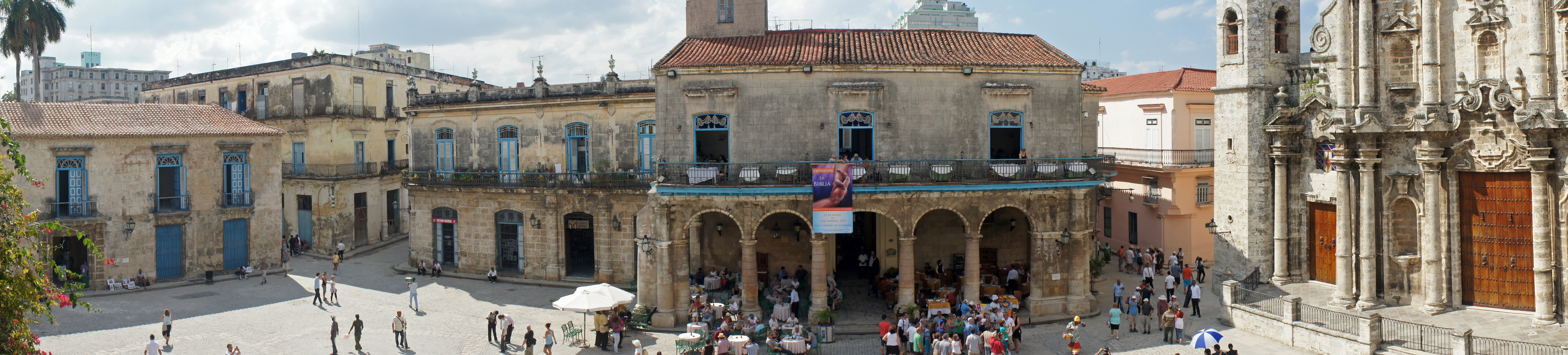
Panoramic view of the Plaza de la Catedral

== Gallery ==
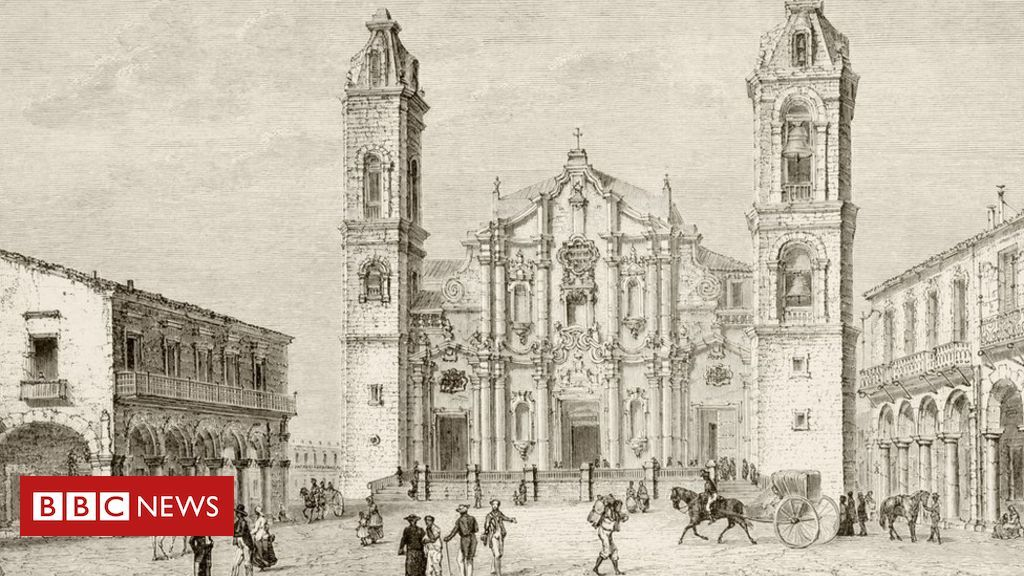
Havana Cathedral in a painting of 1860 by Joseph Navlet.

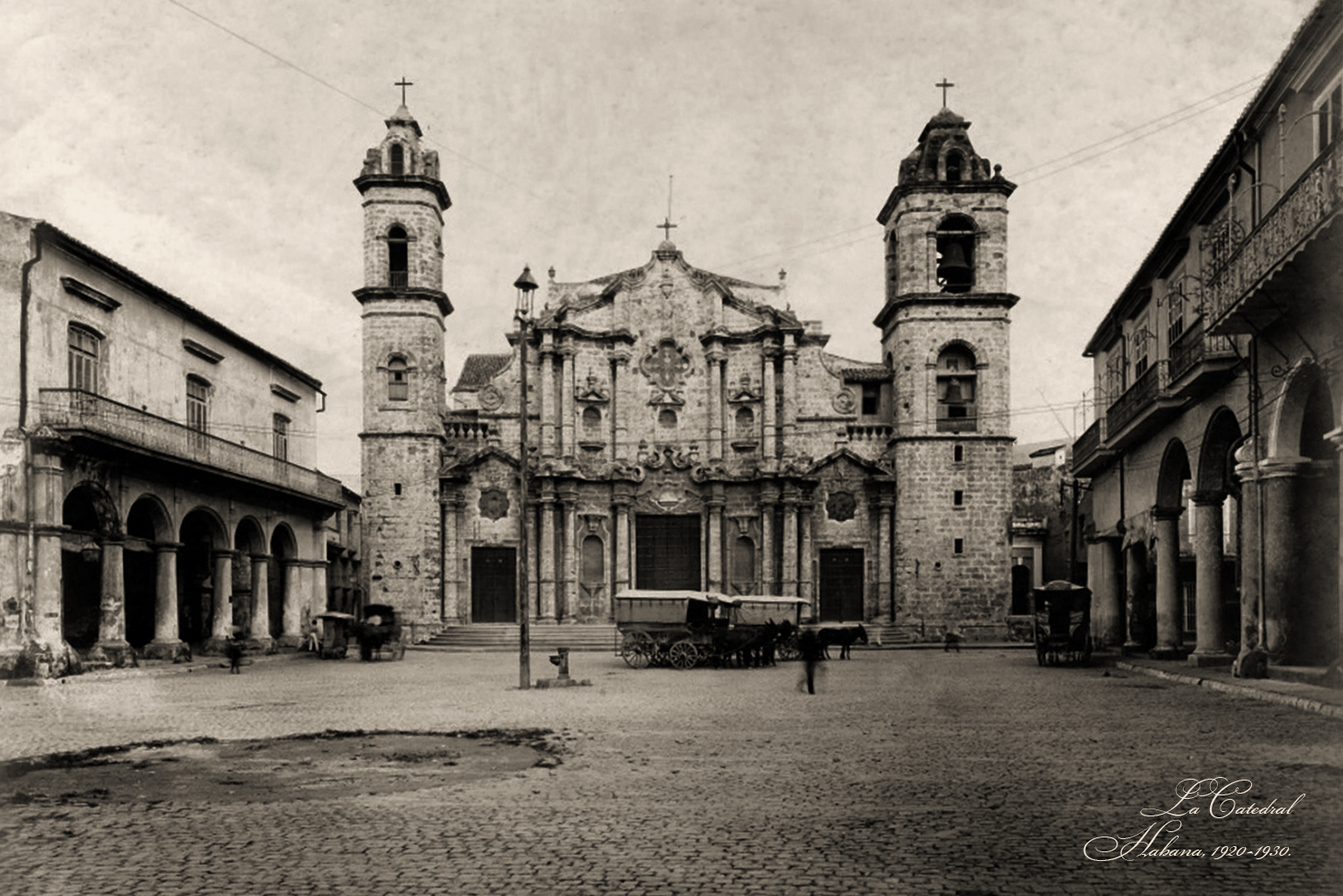
The Havana Cathedral, ca. 1920-1930

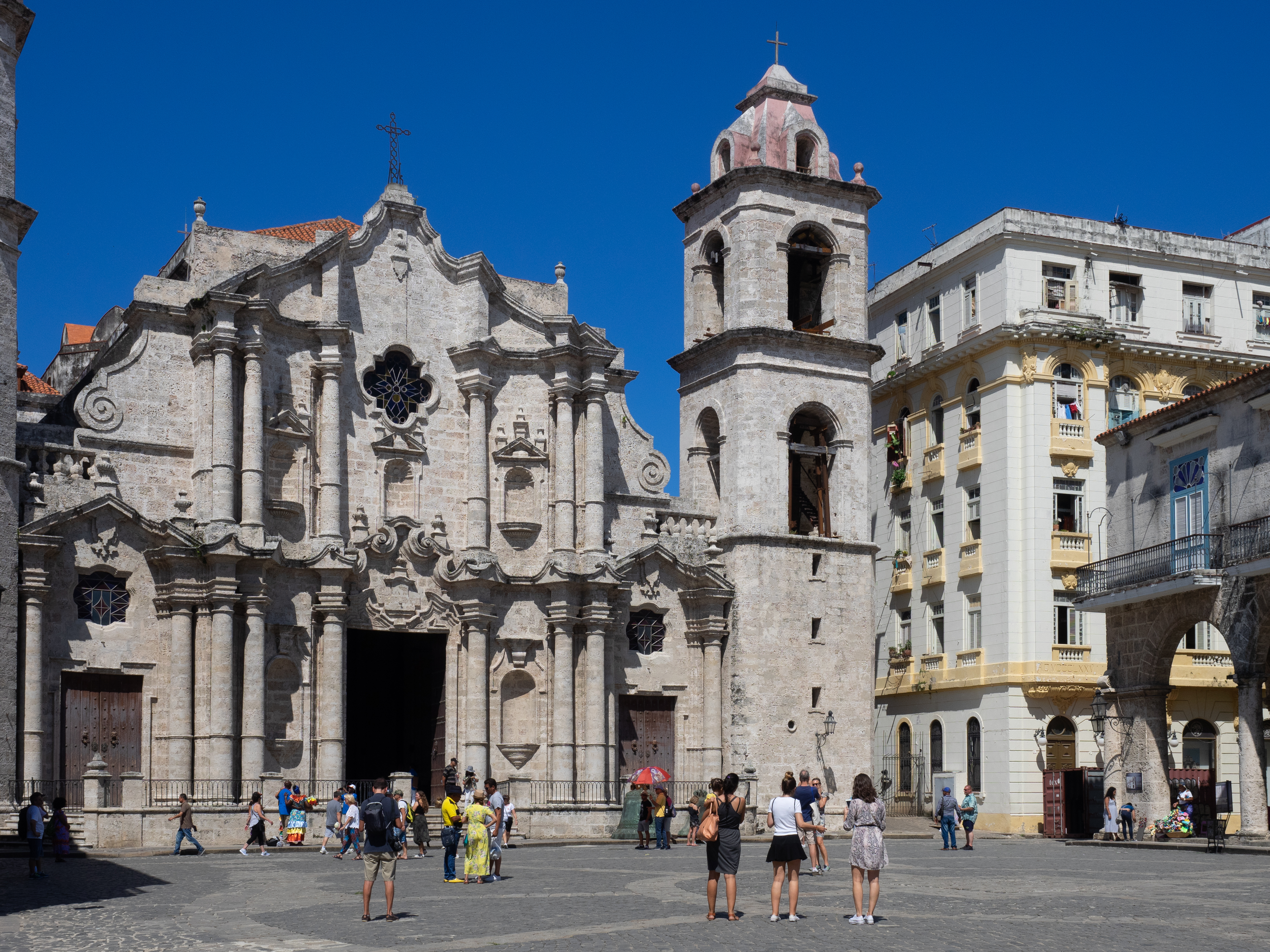
View from the square

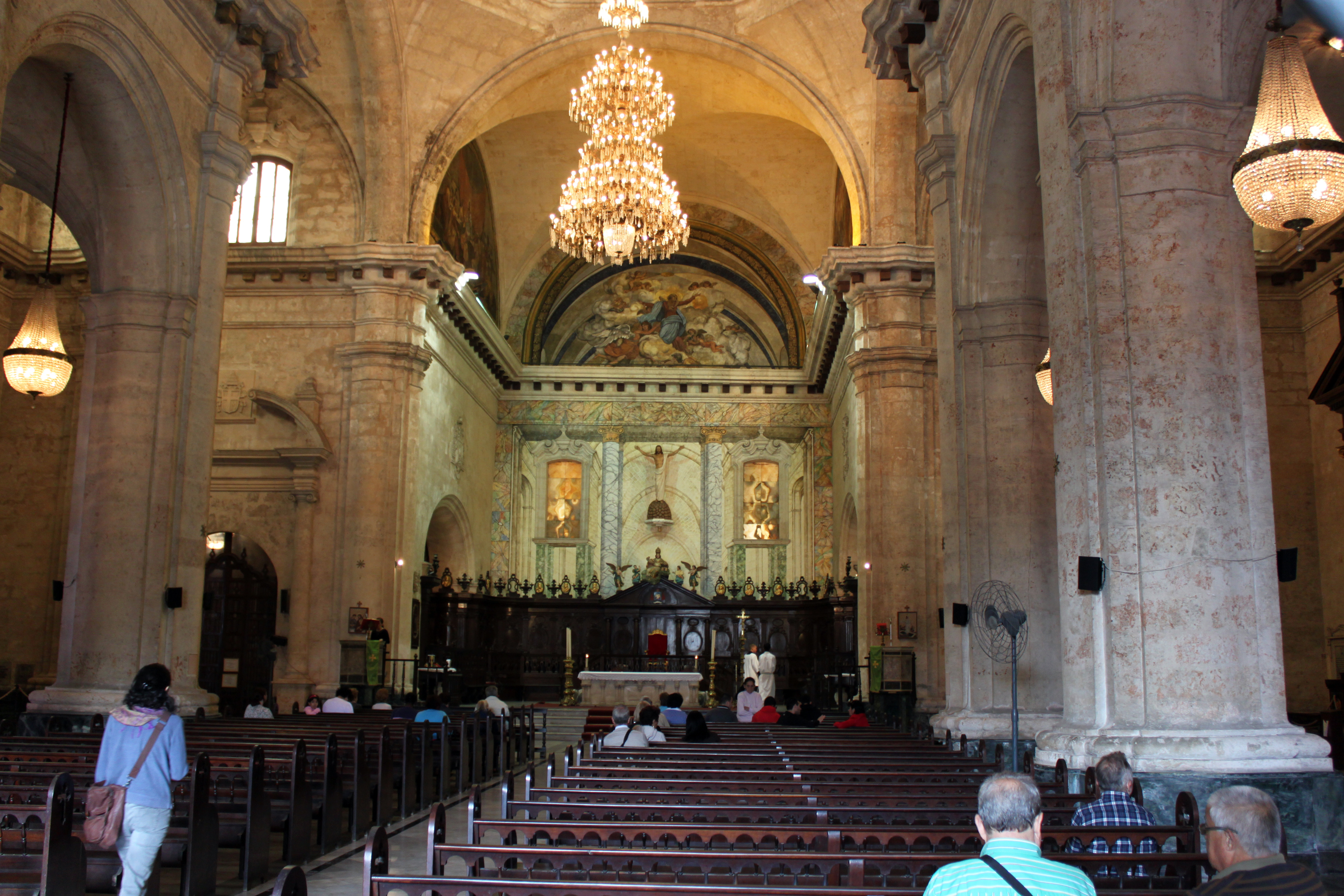

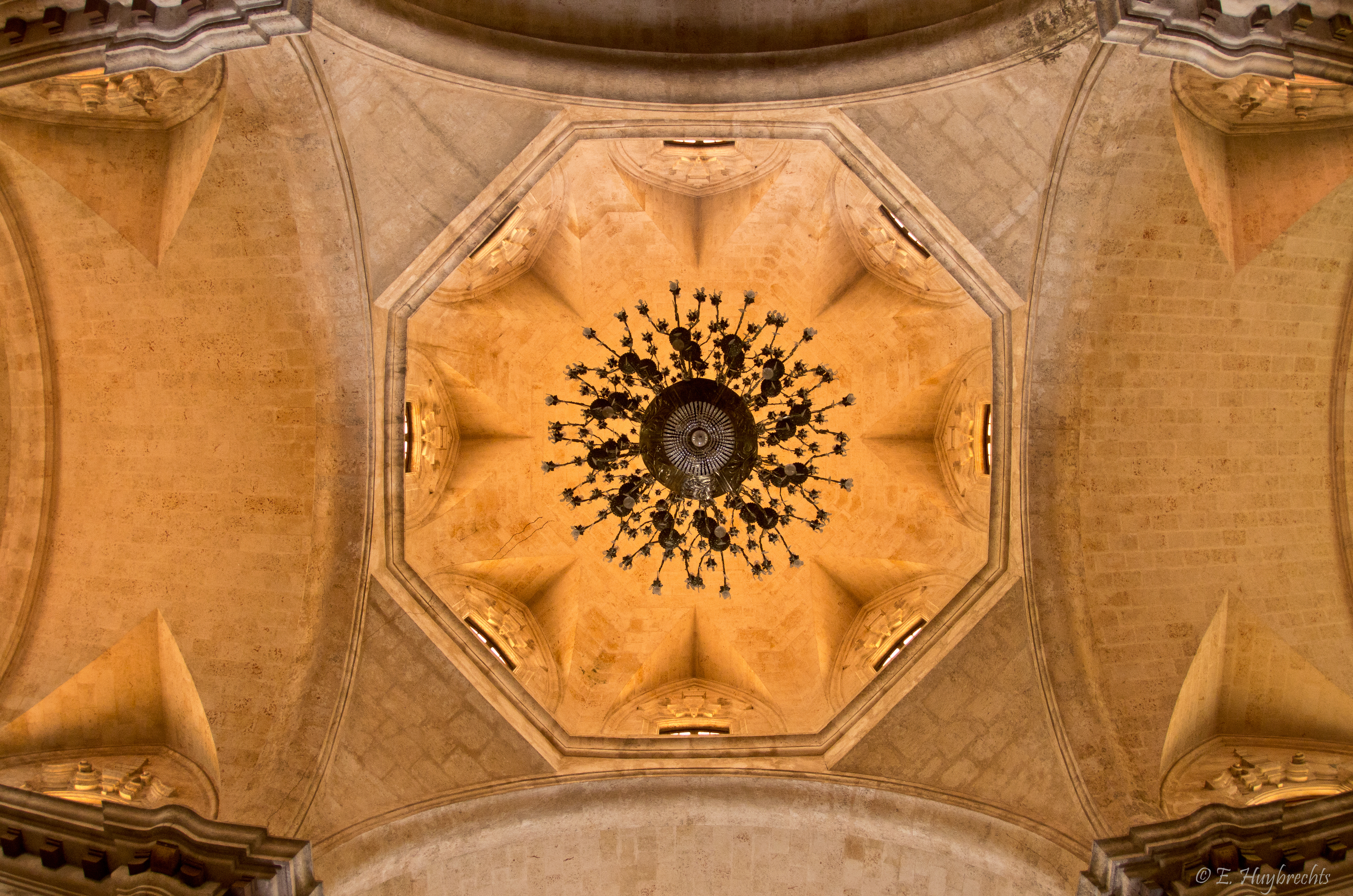

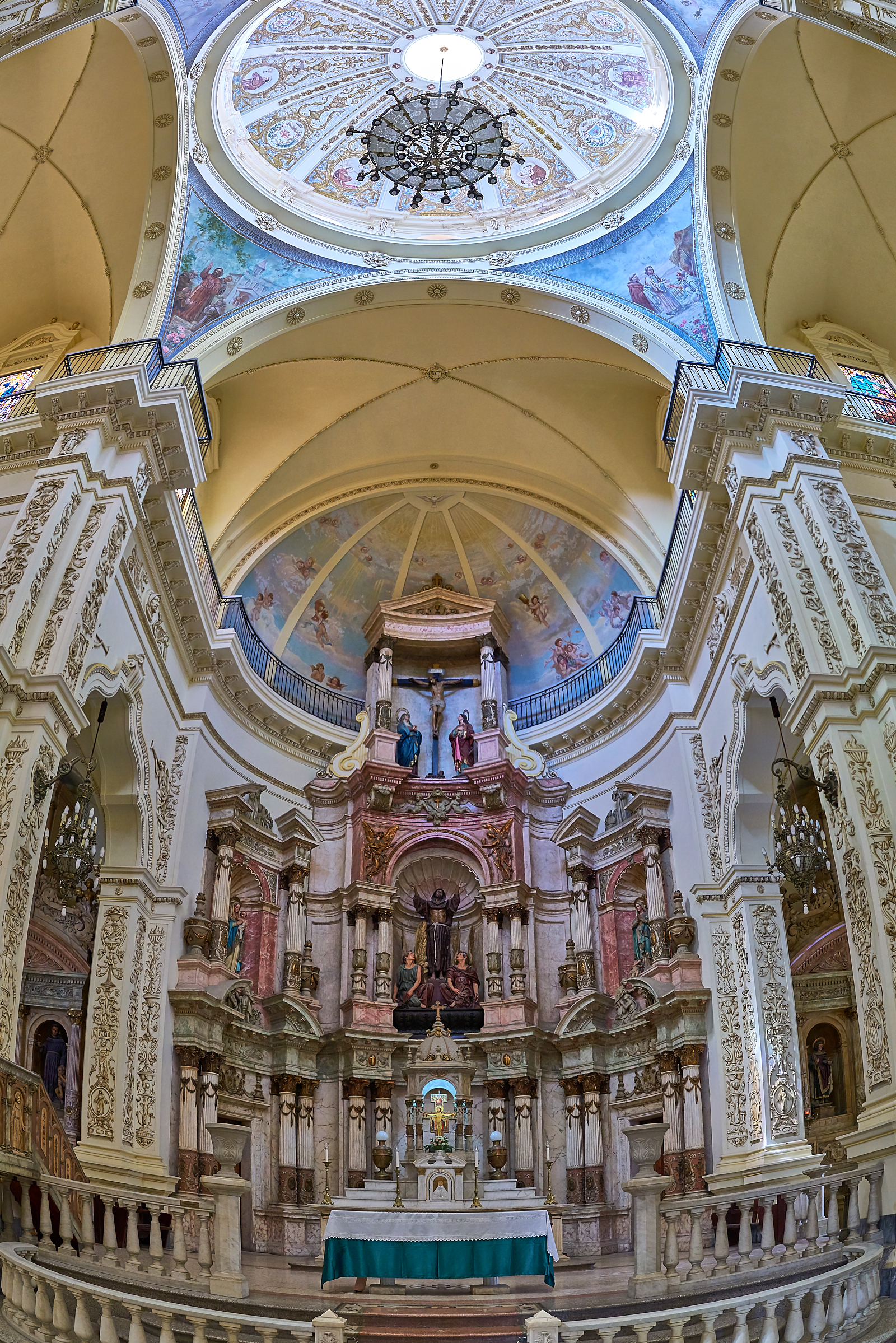
Interior, 2017

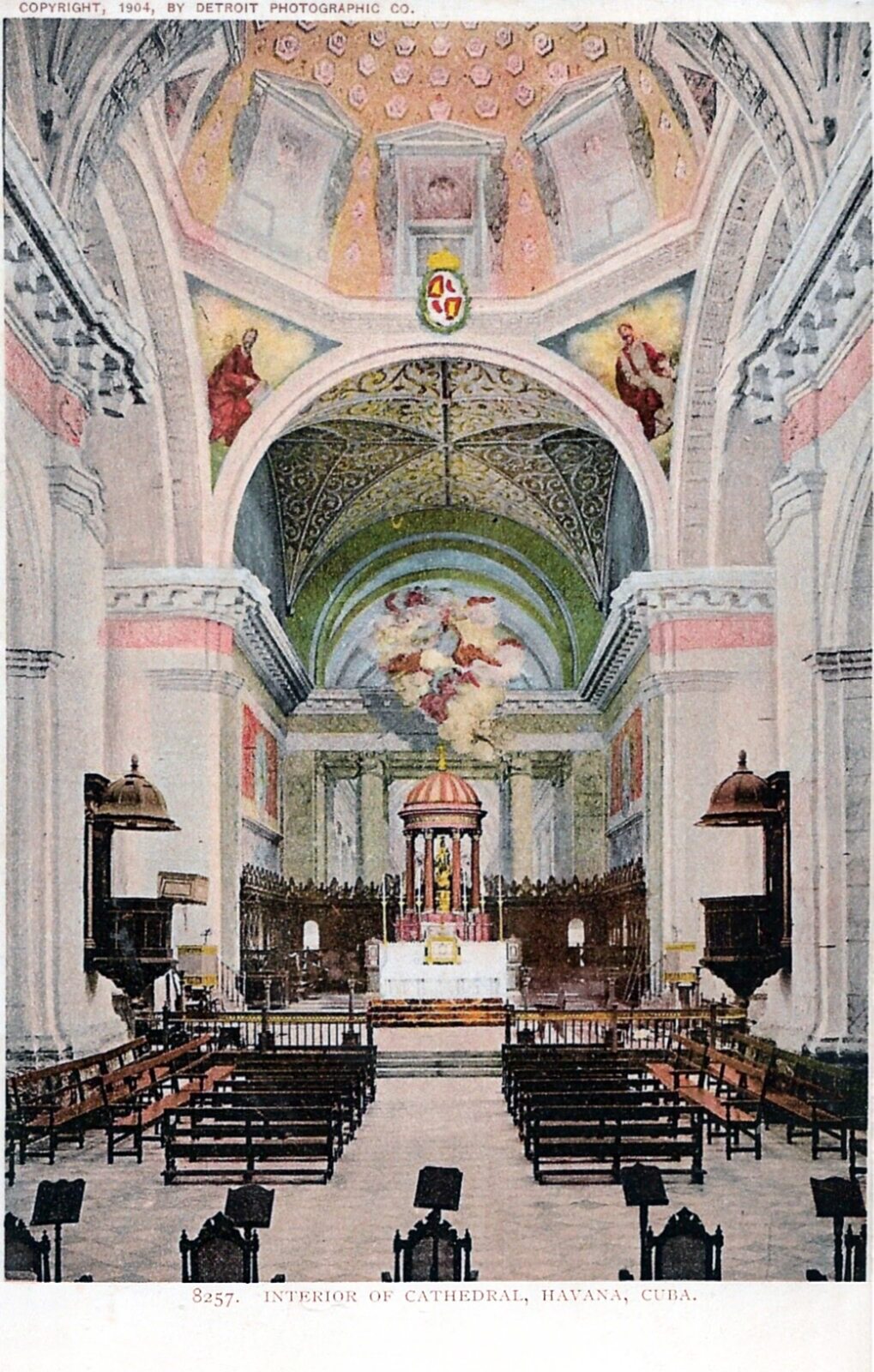
Interior in 1904

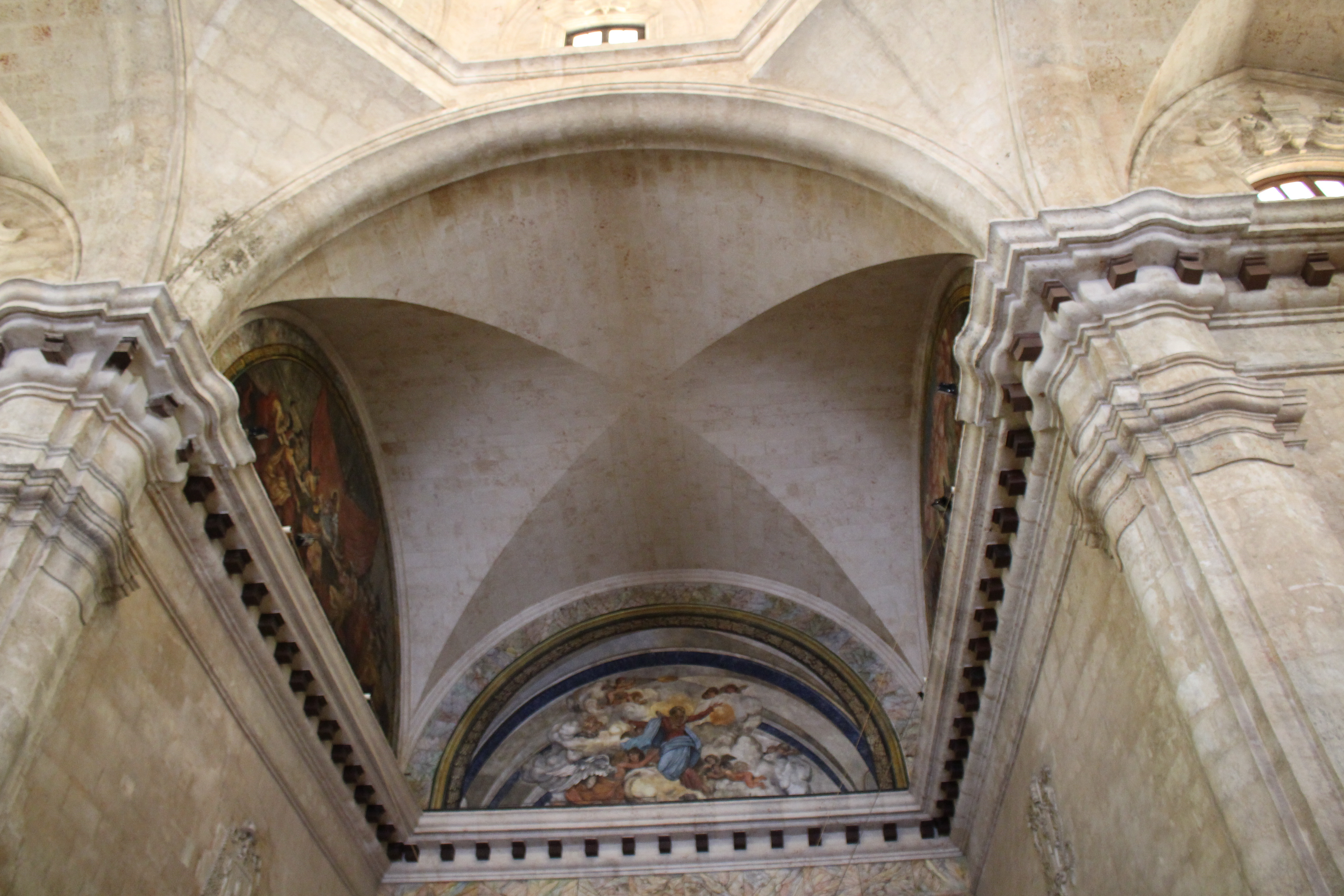

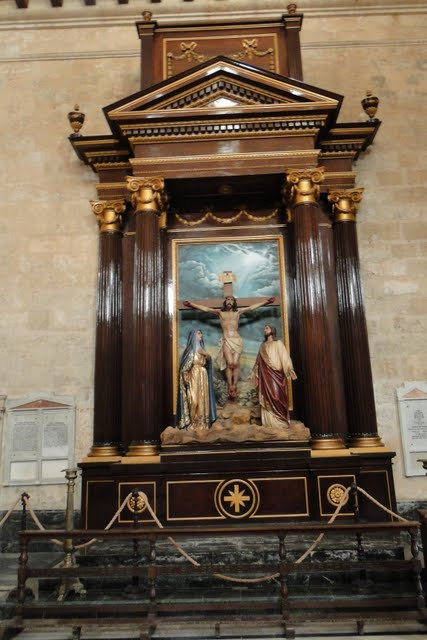

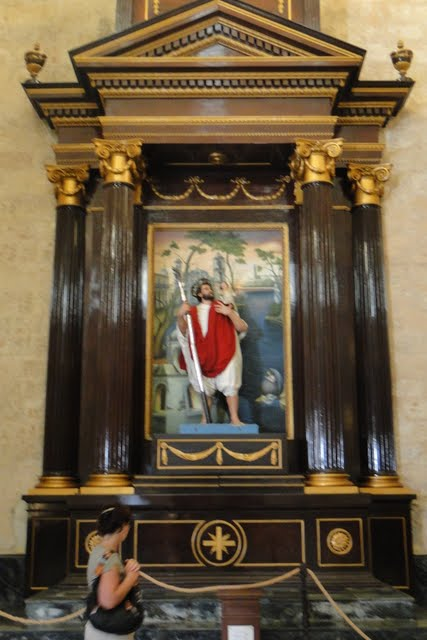

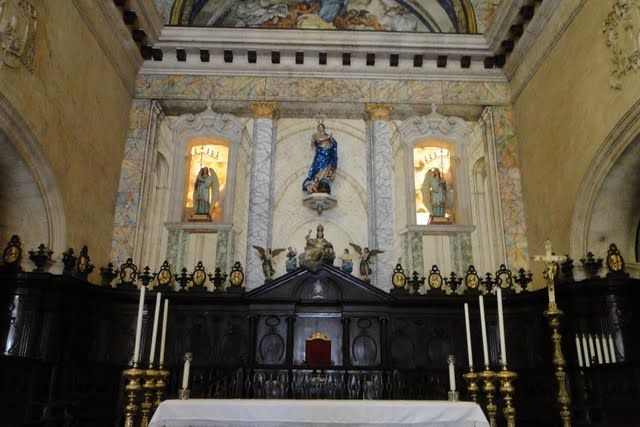

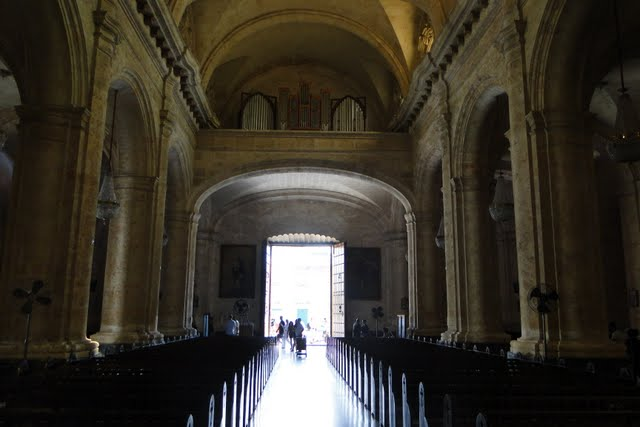

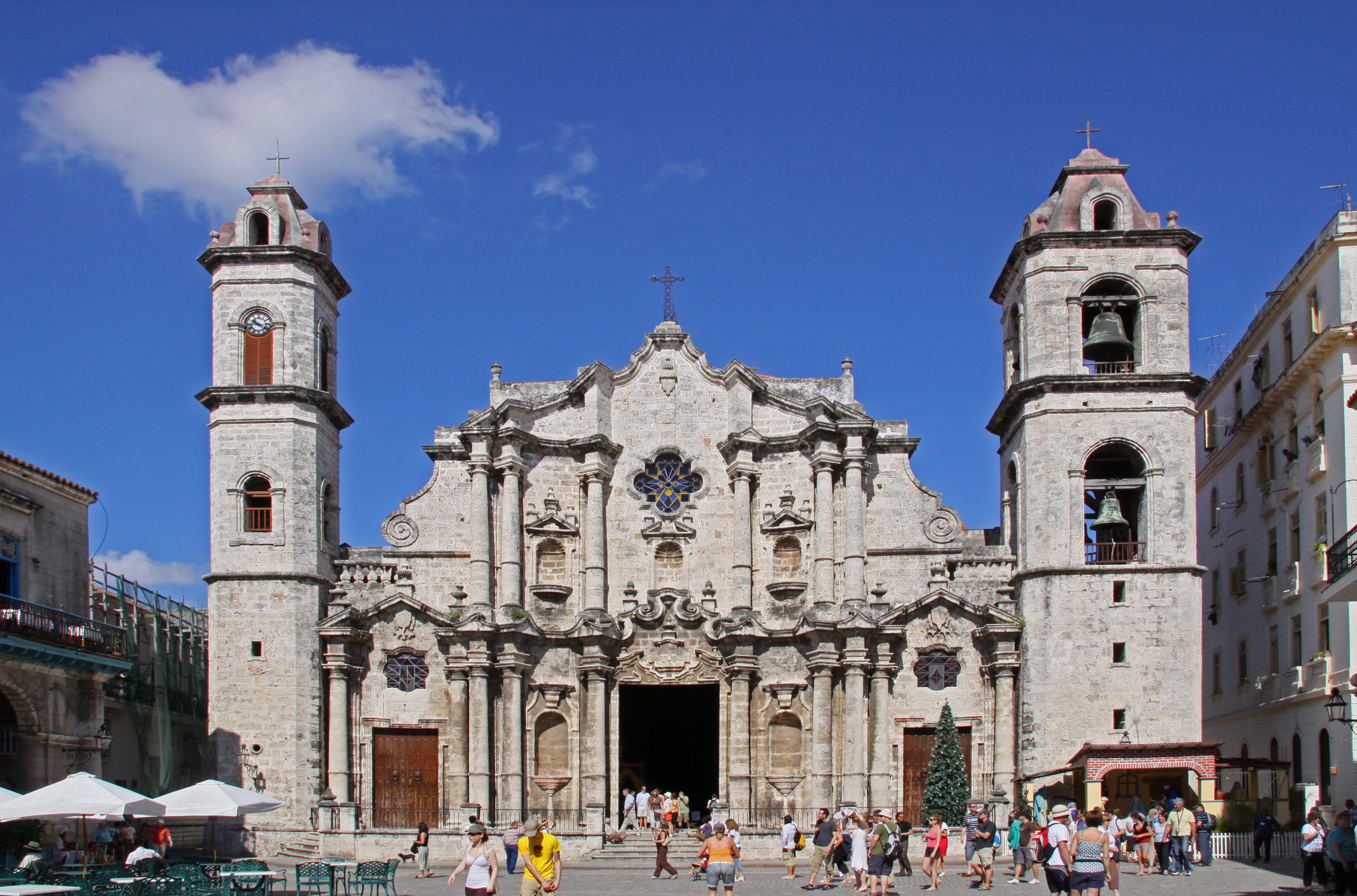

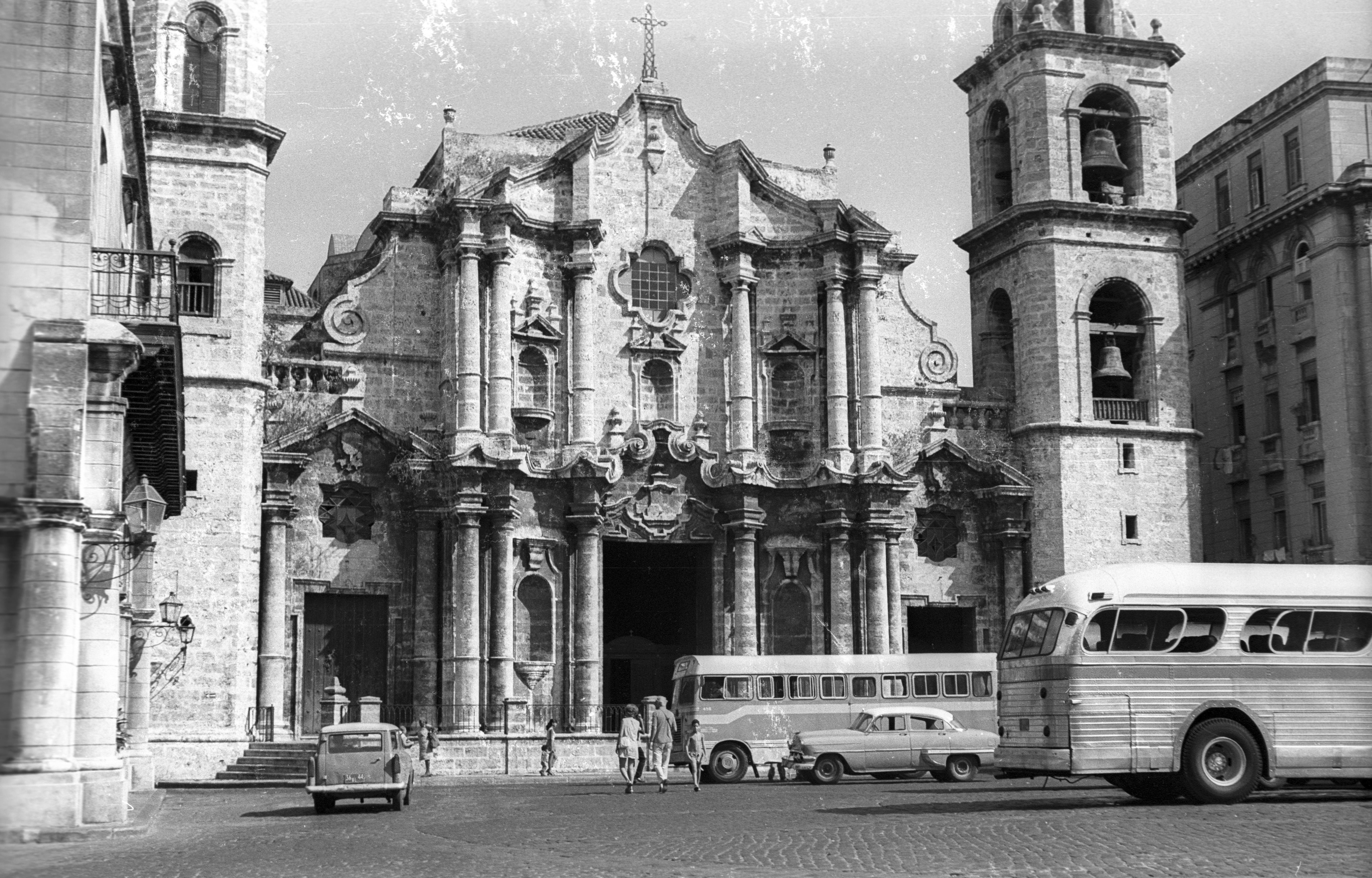
Havana Cathedral in 1974.

== See also ==
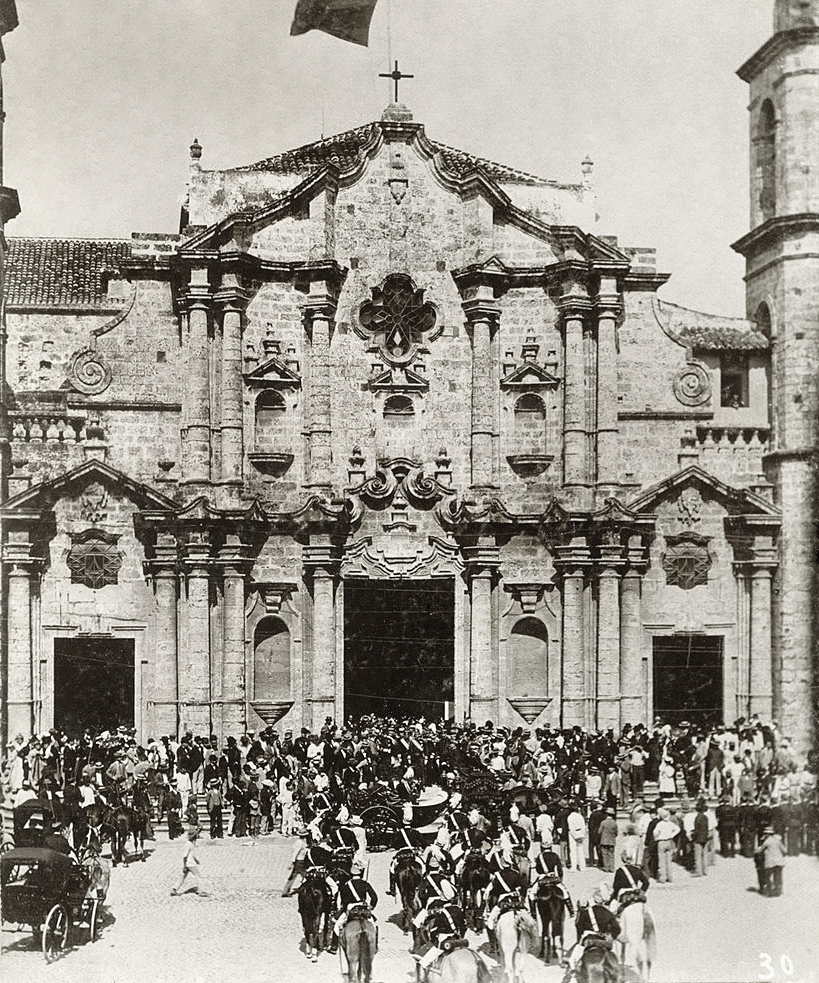
"The Havana Cathedral, where Columbus' remains were kept for many years. They were recently removed to Spain. This view shows General Weyler and staff leaving the Cathedral prior to their departure for Spain" [photo of 1898].

- National Basilica Sanctuary of the Charity del Cobre
- List of Jesuit sites
