= List of Cubans =

This is a list of notable Cubans, ordered alphabetically by first name within each category.

== Additional lists ==
For Cuban-Americans please see List of Cuban Americans

== Art and entertainment ==
=== Actors ===
- Anabelle Acosta (born 1987), actress
- Ana de Armas (born 1988), actress
- Ana Margarita Martínez-Casado (born 1930), actress and singer
- Andy García (born 1956), actor
- César Évora (born 1959), actor
- Daisy Fuentes (born 1966), actress
- Desi Arnaz (1917–1986), actor
- Emiliano Díez (born 1953), actor
- Enrique Molina (1943–2021), actor
- Faizon Love (born 1968), actor and comedian
- Francisco Gattorno (born 1964), actor
- Julio Oscar Mechoso (1955–2017), actor
- Luis Oquendo (1925–1992), actor
- Luisa Martínez Casado (1860–1925), actress
- Manela Bustamante (1924–2005), actress
- María Conchita Alonso (born 1955), actress
- Mario Cimarro (born 1971), actor
- Mario Ernesto Sánchez (1947–2025), actor and founder of Teatro Avante
- Renny Arozarena, actor
- Steven Bauer (born 1956), actor
- Velia Martínez (1920–1993), actress and singer
- William Levy (born 1980), actor
- Nobel Vega (1931–2023), actor, "Tio Nobel"

=== Artists, photographers and fashion designers ===
- Agustín Cárdenas (1927–2001), sculptor
- Alberto Korda (1928–2001), photographer
- Alexandre Arrechea (born 1970), painter, sculptor
- Amelia Peláez (1896–1968), painter
- Baruj Salinas (1935–2024), painter
- Carlos Enríquez (1900–1957), painter
- Fidelio Ponce de León (1895–1949), painter
- Herman Puig (born German Puig Paredes, 1928–2021), photographer
- Humberto Jesús Castro García (born 1957), painter
- José Bernal (1925–2010), painter
- José Vilalta Saavedra (1865–1912), sculptor
- Josignacio (born 1963), creator of plastic paint medium, contemporary painter
- Juan José Sicre (1898–1974), sculptor
- Juan T. Vázquez Martín (1940–2017), painter
- Lourdes Gomez Franca (1933–2017), painter
- Luis Castaneda (1945–2022), photographer
- Mario Perez (born 1943), painter
- Miguel Fleitas (born 1956), painter, photographer
- Miguel Rodez (born 1956), painter, sculptor
- Pedro Álvarez Castelló (1967–2004), painter
- Rafael Consuegra (1941–2021), sculptor
- Raúl Corrales (1925–2006), photographer
- Raúl Martínez (1927–1995), pop artist, painter
- Rene Mederos (1933–1996), poster artist and graphic designer
- René Portocarrero (1912–1985), painter
- Tomas Sanchez (born 1948), painter
- Victor Manuel (born 1947), painter
- Waldo Diaz-Balart (1931–2025), painter
- Wifredo Lam (1902–1982), painter

=== Authors and poets ===
- Alejo Carpentier (1904–1980), novelist
- Antonio Benitez-Rojo (1931–2005), author
- Brígida Agüero (1837–1866), poet
- Daína Chaviano (born 1957), author
- Carilda Oliver Labra (1922–2018), poet
- Domitila García de Coronado (1847–1938), writer and journalist
- Dulce María Loynaz (1902–1997), author
- Edmundo Desnoes (1930–2023), author
- Gertrudis Gómez de Avellaneda (1814–1873), author, poet
- Guillermo Cabrera Infante (1929–2005), author
- Heberto Padilla (1932–2000), poet
- Héctor Zumbado (1932–2016), writer, journalist, humorist, critic
- José Ignacio Rivero (1920–2011), author and journalist
- Antonio Rodríguez Salvador (born 1960), poet, author
- José Lezama Lima (1910–1976), author, poet
- Mary Stanley Low (1912–2007), British-Cuban political activist, surrealist poet, artist and Latin teacher
- José María Heredia y Campuzano (1803–1839), poet
- José Martí (1853–1895), author, poet, journalist
- David Masnata y de Quesada (1926–1988), author and historian
- Julián del Casal (1863–1893), 19th-century poet
- Leonardo Padura Fuentes (born 1955), novelist, journalist
- Mariano Brull (1891–1956), author
- Nancy Morejón (born 1944), author
- José Gómez-Sicre (1916–1991), art critic and author
- Nicolás Guillén (1902–1989), poet
- Norberto Fuentes (born 1943), author
- Pedro Juan Gutiérrez (born 1950), author, poet, painter
- Pedro Luis Boitel (1931–1972), poet
- Raúl Rivero (1945–2021), poet and journalist
- Reinaldo Arenas (1943–1990), author
- Severo Sarduy (1937–1993), poet
- Virgilio Piñera (1912–1979), author, playwright, poet, short-story writer and essayist
- Zoé Valdés (born 1959), author
- Cirilo Villaverde (1812–1894)

=== Composers ===
- Alejandro García Caturla (1906–1940), symphonic composer
- Mariá Álvarez Rios (1919–2010), composer
- Aurelio de la Vega (1925–2022), composer, lecturer, essayist and poet
- Antonio María Romeu (1876–1955), composer
- Arsenio Rodríguez (1911–1970), developer of the rumba
- Didier Hernández (born 1979), singer, composer; former member of Menudo and MDO
- Ernesto Lecuona (1896–1963), often regarded as the greatest Cuban composer
- Esteban Salas y Castro (1725–1803), 18th century Cuban baroque composer
- Gonzalo Roig (1890–1970), often regarded as one of the greatest composers of Cuba, "Quiere me mucho"/ Cecilia Valdez
- Ignacio Cervantes (1847–1905), Chopinesque piano composer
- José White Lafitte (1836–1918), violinist and composer
- Leo Brouwer (born 1939), guitarist and composer
- Yalil Guerra (born 1973), composer
- Amadeo Roldán (1900–1939), composer and violinist
- Dámaso Pérez Prado (1916–1989), developer of the mambo
- Armando Rodriguez-Gonzalez (1889–1965), composer
- Antonio Rodríguez Ferrer (1864–1935), composer
- René Touzet (1916–2003), composer, bandleader and pianist
- Flores Chaviano, guitarist and composer
- Danilo Avilés, composer
- Magaly Ruiz, composer
- José Ardévol (1911–1981), composer
- Harold Gramatges (1918–2008), composer
- Carlos Fariñas (1934–2002), composer
- Roberto Valera, composer
- Julián Orbón (1925–1991), composer
- Margarita Lecuona (1910–1981), singer and composer

=== Chess ===
- José Raúl Capablanca (1888–1942), chess world champion, grandmaster considered "the Mozart of Chess"
- Juan Corzo (1873–1941), chess
- Lázaro Bruzón (born 1982), chess grandmaster
- María Teresa Mora (1902–1980)

=== Musicians ===
- Aida Diestro, pianist, arranger
- Albita, singer
- Alfredo de la Fé, musician
- Adalberto Álvarez, pianist, director, composer
- Ángel Reyes, violinist
- AJ McLean, singer, member of American boyband The Backstreet Boys
- Armando Peraza, percussionist
- Arturo Sandoval, trumpeter
- Arsenio Rodríguez, composer
- Benny Moré, singer, songwriter, conductor, arranger
- Bola de Nieve, singer, pianist
- Camila Cabello, musician, songwriter, actress
- Cándido Fabré, musician, singer-songwriter
- Carlos Manuel Pruneda, singer
- Carlos Varela, singer-songwriter
- Celia Cruz, singer
- Celina González, singer-songwriter
- Cesar "Pupy" Pedroso, pianist, musician
- Chanel Terrero, singer
- Christina Milian, singer
- Chucho Valdés, pianist, bandleader, composer, arranger
- Compay Segundo, musician, songwriter
- Conchita Espinosa, pianist, teacher
- Cuban Link, rapper
- Cubanito 20.02, hip-hop band
- Dave Lombardo, drummer
- David Calzado, musician
- Didier Hernández, singer-songwriter
- Donna Maria Martinez, guitarist and singer
- Eddy Zervigon, flautist and bandleader
- Elena Burke, singer
- El Medico, timba musician
- El Taiger, reggaeton musician
- Eliades Ochoa, guitarist and singer
- Emilio Estefan, producer, composer
- Ernesto Lecuona, pianist, composer
- Esther Borja, singer
- Eusebio Delfín, singer
- Francisco Aguabella, percussionist
- German Nogueira Gomez, songwriter, composer, producer
- Gloria Estefan, singer, composer
- Gonzalo Rubalcaba, pianist
- Guillermo Portabales, singer, songwriter
- Guillermo Rubalcaba, musician
- Harold Lopez Nussa, jazz pianist
- Horacio Gutiérrez, concert pianist
- Hubert de Blanck, pianist, composer
- Ignacio Piñeiro, composer
- Ibrahim Ferrer, musician
- Isabel LaRosa, singer
- Issac Delgado, singer
- Jacobo Rubalcaba, musician
- Jorge Bolet, concert pianist
- Juan Croucier, bassist
- Juan Formell, composer
- Juan de Marcos González, musician
- La Lupe, singer
- Lena, singer
- Lissette, singer
- Malena Burke, singer
- Manuel Barrueco, classical guitarist
- María Teresa Vera, composer, guitarist, singer
- Mayra Verónica, singer
- Miguel Matamoros, singer, composer
- Moisés Valle, musician
- Moisés Simons, composer
- Mongo Santamaría, jazz musician
- Moraima Secada, singer
- Nelson Martinez, baritone
- Ñico Saquito, composer, singer
- Olga Guillot, singer
- Omara Portuondo, singer
- Orlando "Cachaito" López, bassist
- Pablo Milanés, singer-songwriter
- Pío Leyva, singer
- Pitbull, rapper
- Raul Paz, singer
- Rey Ruiz, singer
- Rita Montaner, singer
- Roberto Faz, singer, conductor
- Rubén González, pianist
- Rudy Sarzo, rock bassist
- Sabrina Claudio, singer
- Sen Dog, rapper
- Silvio Rodríguez, singer-songwriter
- Tico Torres, drummer, percussionist
- Willy Chirino, singer-songwriter
- Voltaire (musician), musician
- Xavier Cugat, musician
- Yamila Guerra, singer, actress, and dancer
- Yalil Guerra, producer, musician, composer
- Yotuel Romero, rapper

=== Film directors ===
- Ernesto Daranas
- Fernando Pérez
- Humberto Padrón
- Jorge Luis Sánchez
- Juan Carlos Cremata
- Juan Padrón
- Miguel Coyula
- Rodrigo García
- Santiago Álvarez
- Tomás Gutiérrez Alea

=== Journalists ===
- Calixto Martínez
- German Pinelli
- Héctor Zumbado, writer, journalist, humorist, and critic
- Idania Martínez Grandales, broadcaster, journalist and academic, and professor
- Nicolás Guillén
- Oscar Espinosa Chepe
- Pablo de la Torriente Brau
- Raúl Rivero
- Rick Sanchez

=== Dancers ===
- Alicia Alonso, Prima Ballerina Assoluta, director of the Cuban National Ballet (Ballet Nacional de Cuba)
- Carlos Acosta, dancer
- Sadaise Arencibia, star dancer with the Cuban National Ballet
- Fernando Bujones, dancer
- Jose Manuel Carreño, American Ballet Theatre principal dancer
- Lydia Diaz Cruz, prima ballerina
- Miguel Campaneria, ballet dancer, current artistic director of the National Ballet Theater of Puerto Rico
- Vida Guerra, video dancer
- Yat-Sen Chang, principal dancer, English National Ballet

=== Other entertainment ===
- Alvarez Guedes, comedian and author
- Ana María Polo, television personality and lawyer
- Alina María Hernández, "Cachita", television personality
- Cristina Saralegui, magazine editor, talk show host (Cristina) and actress
- Vida Guerra, model/actress
- Lili Estefan, television personality and former model
- Mauricio Zeilic, television personality
- Mayra Verónica, model
- Nelson Ascencio, comedian (Madtv)
- Pedro Zamora, AIDS activist, featured on The Real World: San Francisco
- Raúl De Molina, television personality
- Raúl Musibay, Food Network chef and author
- Rosaura Andreu, children's television entertainer

== Sport ==
=== Baseball ===
- Adeiny Hechavarria, Miami Marlins
- Adolfo Luque, Cincinnati Reds
- Alex Fernandez, Chicago White Sox, Florida Marlins
- Alex Sánchez
- Ariel Pestano, Cuba national baseball team
- Ariel Prieto, Oakland Athletics
- Aroldis Chapman, Cincinnati Reds
- Aurelio Monteagudo, Kansas City Athletics
- Barbaro Canizares, Atlanta Braves
- Bárbaro Garbey, Detroit Tigers
- Bert Campaneris, Kansas City Athletics
- Brayan Peña, Atlanta Braves
- Cristóbal Torriente, Negro leagues, Baseball Hall of Fame
- Danys Báez, Baltimore Orioles
- Diego Seguí, Kansas City Athletics
- Eli Marrero, New York Mets
- Esteban Bellán, first Latin American professional baseball player to play in the United States
- Germán Mesa, trainer for the Cuban national baseball team
- Jack Calvo, Washington Senators
- Jasiel Rivero (born 1993), basketball player for Maccabi Tel Aviv in the Israeli Basketball Premier League
- Jorge Soler, Chicago Cubs
- José Abreu, Chicago White Sox
- José Canseco, Oakland Athletics
- José Cardenal, San Francisco Giants
- José Contreras, Chicago White Sox
- José Fernández, Miami Marlins
- José Iglesias, Detroit Tigers
- José Méndez, Kansas City Monarchs, Baseball Hall of Fame
- José Rodríguez, New York Giants
- José Tartabull, Kansas City Athletics
- Kendrys Morales, Kansas City Royals
- Liván Hernández, Arizona Diamondbacks
- Luis Tiant, Cleveland Indians
- Martín Dihigo, Negro leagues, Baseball Hall of Fame
- Mike Cuellar, Cincinnati Reds
- Minnie Miñoso, Chicago White Sox
- Octavio "Cookie" Rojas, Cincinnati Reds
- Omar Linares, Pinar del Río Vegueros, Cuban national baseball team
- Orestes Destrade, New York Yankees, ESPN on-air personality
- Orlando Hernández, New York Mets
- Ozzie Canseco, Oakland Athletics
- Pedro Ramos, Washington Senators
- Preston Gómez, Washington Senators
- Rafael Palmeiro, Baltimore Orioles
- Ray Noble, New York Giants
- René Arocha, St. Louis Cardinals
- René Monteagudo, Washington Senators
- Rey Ordóñez, New York Mets
- Roberto "Bobby" Estalella, Washington Senators
- Rolando Arrojo, Tampa Bay Devil Rays
- Sandy Amorós, Brooklyn Dodgers
- Tony Fossas, Texas Rangers
- Tony González, Cincinnati Reds
- Tony Oliva, Minnesota Twins
- Tony Pérez, Cincinnati Reds
- Tony Taylor, Chicago Cubs
- Yuniesky Betancourt, last played for the Milwaukee Brewers
- Yasiel Puig, Los Angeles Dodgers
- Yasmani Grandal, Los Angeles Dodgers
- Yoenis Céspedes, New York Mets
- Zoilo Versalles, Minnesota Twins, first Latin American Major League MVP in 1965
- Alexei Ramírez, Chicago White Sox
- Yunel Escobar, Washington Nationals

=== Boxing ===
- Adolfo Horta, featherweight Olympic boxer
- Ariel Hernández, Middleweight Olympic boxer
- Armando Martínez, light middle-weight Olympic boxer
- Benny Paret, boxer
- Eliseo Castillo, boxer
- Félix Savón, Olympic boxer
- Florentino Fernández, boxer
- Guillermo Rigondeaux Ortiz, amateur boxer
- Joel Casamayor, boxer
- Jorge Rubio, boxing trainer
- José Nápoles, boxer
- Kid Charol, boxer
- Kid Chocolate, boxer
- Kid Gavilán, boxer
- Lorenzo Aragon Armenteros, Olympic welterweight boxer
- Luis Manuel Rodríguez, boxer
- Mario César Kindelán Mesa, Olympic gold medal-winning boxer
- Raúl González, boxer
- Roberto Balado, Olympic super heavyweight boxer
- Sugar Ramos, world champion boxer
- Teófilo Stevenson, amateur boxer
- Yan Bartelemí, light flyweight gold medal-winning boxer
- Yanqui Díaz, boxer
- Yudel Johnson Cedeno light-welterweight Olympic boxer
- Yuriorkis Gamboa, flyweight Olympic gold medal-winning boxer

=== Athletes ===
- Alberto Juantorena, track
- Aliecer Urrutia, triple jump
- Ana Fidelia Quirot, 800m
- Anier García, hurdler
- Dayron Robles, hurdling athlete
- Emeterio González, javelin thrower
- Héctor Herrera, sprinter
- Ioamnet Quintero, high jumper
- Iván García, sprinter
- Iván Pedroso, long jump
- Javier Sotomayor, track and field record setter
- Joel Isasi, sprinter
- Joel Lamela, sprinter
- Jorge Aguilera, sprinter
- Lázaro Martínez, sprinter
- Luis Alberto Pérez-Rionda, sprinter
- Osleidys Menéndez, javelin
- Roberto Hernández
- Roberto Moya, discus throw
- Víctor Moya, high jumper
- Yargelis Savigne, jump
- Yarisley Silva, pole vaulter
- Yipsi Moreno, hammer thrower
- Yoandri Betanzos, triple jump
- Yoel García, triple jumper
- Yoel Hernández, hurdler
- Yudelkis Fernández, long jumper
- Yunaika Crawford, hammer thrower
- Yuniel Hernández, hurdler

=== Swimming ===
- Joel Armas, record holder in the US in monofin swimming
- Neisser Bent, bronze medalist at the 1996 Summer Olympics
- Rodolfo Falcón, silver medalist at the 1996 Summer Olympics
- Leonel "Bebito" Smith, gold medalist in the 1926 and 1930 Central American and Caribbean Games

=== Volleyball ===
- Wilfredo Leon
- Osmany Juantorena
- Yoandry Leal
- Robertlandy Simon
- Diego Lapera
- Leonel Marshall
- Leonel Marshall Jr
- Joel Despaigne
- Raul Diago
- Alfredo Figueredo
- Alain Roca
- Melissa Vargas
- Regla Torres
- Magaly Carvajal
- Mireya Luis
- Ana Fernández

=== Other ===
- Deborah Andollo, holds world records in free diving
- Alberto Delgado, soccer
- Ivan Dominguez, two time gold medalist in the Pan American Games and Cuban national champion in cycling
- Héctor Socorro, footballer
- Ibrahim Rojas, flatwater canoer
- Juan Tuñas, former Cuban footballer
- Manrique Larduet, gymnast
- Rey Ángel Martínez, soccer
- Tomás Fernández, footballer in the 1938 World Cup
- Yanelis Yuliet Labrada Diaz, Olympic silver medallist in Taekwondo
- Maykel Galindo, soccer
- Jorge Sánchez Salgado, volleyball player
- Mijaín López, Greco-Roman wrestler

== Politics ==
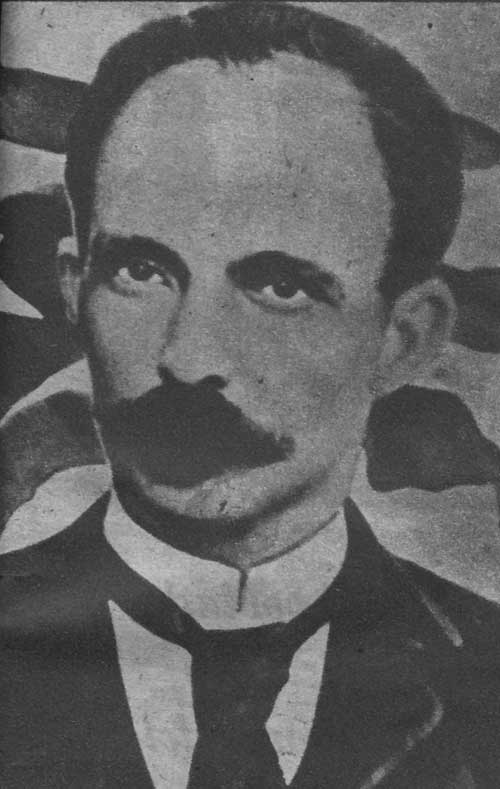
Poet and writer José Martí

Politician and first secretary of the Cuban communist party, Fidel Castro

=== Current ===
- Abelardo Colomé Ibarra, vice president of the Council of State of Cuba
- Alfonso Fraga-Perez, diplomat, secretary general of the Organization of Solidarity of the People of Asia, Africa & Latin America (OSPAAAL), former head of Cuban Interests Section
- Carlos Lage Dávila, former executive secretary of the Council of Ministers of Cuba
- Felipe Pérez Roque, former Cuban government minister
- Fidel Castro, first secretary of the Communist Party of Cuba 1965–2011
- José Luis Rodríguez García, Cuban government minister
- José Ramón Balaguer Cabrera, current minister for health in Cuba
- Juan Almeida Bosque, third ranking member of the Cuban Council of State
- Liaena Hernandez Martínez, youngest member of the Cuban National Assembly
- Juan Valdés Figueroa, diplomat
- Luis Posada Carriles, paramilitary leader, accused terrorist
- Mariela Castro, director of the Cuban National Center for Sex Education and daughter of Raúl Castro
- Miguel Díaz-Canel, current first secretary of the Communist Party of Cuba, since 2021
- Oscar Elías Biscet, physician and dissident and founder of the Lawton Foundation, currently jailed
- Oswaldo Payá, founder of Proyecto Varela
- Pedro Pablo Prada Quintero, diplomat
- Raúl Castro, first secretary of the Communist Party of Cuba 2011–2021
- Roberto Fernández Retamar, president of the Casa de las Américas
- Ricardo Alarcón, president of the Cuban National Assembly
- Rosa Elena Simeón Negrín, former minister of science, technology and the environment

=== Historical ===
- Abel Santamaría, Cuban revolutionary
- Alcibiades Hidalgo, former ambassador to the UN
- Ana Betancourt, first to campaign for equal rights for Cuban women, in 1868 during the Ten Years' War
- Andrés Rivero Agüero, Cuba's prime minister from March 1957 to March 1958
- Anselmo Alliegro, acting president of Cuba for one day (1–2 January 1959) after the departure of General Fulgencio Batista from the country
- Antonio Guiteras, politician and revolutionary
- Antonio Maceo, revolutionary, military strategist
- Armando Hart Dávalos, politician and Communist leader
- Asela de los Santos, Cuban revolutionary, educator and politician
- Camilo Cienfuegos, Cuban revolutionary
- Carlos Hevia, provisional president of Cuba 1934
- Pilar Jorge de Tella, suffragist
- Carlos Manuel Piedra, acting president of Cuba for one day (2 January 1959) after the departure of General Fulgencio Batista from the country
- Carlos Prío Socarrás, former president of Cuba
- Celia Sánchez, Cuban revolutionary and secretary to the presidency of the Council of Ministers
- Cosme Torres Espinoza, ambassador to Zimbabwe
- Eduardo Chibás, Cuban politician who used radio to broadcast his political views against Batista's government to the public
- Federico Laredo Brú, president of Cuba 1936–1940
- Fernando Tarrida del Mármol, Cuban anarchist
- Fabio Grobart, Communist leader
- Fulgencio Batista, former Cuban President
- Frank País, 20th century revolutionary
- Gerardo Machado, Cuban president 1920–33
- Gustavo Arcos, Cuban revolutionary, later an imprisoned dissident
- Huber Matos, Cuban revolutionary
- Ignacio Agramonte, 19th-century Cuban revolutionary
- Jorge Mas Canosa, founder of the Cuban American National Foundation
- José Miró Cardona, president of Cuba in 1959
- José Martí, poet, philosopher, politician, writer, revolutionary
- Juan Carlos Robinson Agramonte, former member of the Cuban politburo and first secretary of the Provincial Committee of the Cuban Communist Party in Santiago de Cuba
- Julio Antonio Mella, founder of the original Cuban Communist Party
- Jorge Payret, diplomat and academic
- Leopoldo Cancio, deputy and Sectetary of Education
- Manuel Piñeiro, first head of the Cuban General Intelligence Directorate
- Manuel Urrutia Lleó, provisional Cuban President January to July 1959
- María Cabrales, activist, revolutionary and nurse
- Miguel Mariano Gómez, president of Cuba for seven months in 1936
- Paul Lafargue, Cuban-born French Communist and son-in-law to Karl Marx
- Pedro Pablo Cazañas, judge and politician
- Rafael Diaz-Balart, politician and majority leader during presidency of Batista
- Ramón Grau, Cuban president for two terms 1933, 1940–44
- Saturnino and Mariano Lora, brothers and 19th century revolutionaries
- Vilma Espín Guillois, President of the Cuban Federation of Women, wife of Raúl Castro
- Virgilio Paz Romero, anti-Castro paramilitary

== Religion ==
- Alfredo Llaguno-Canals, former auxiliary bishop of Havana
- Miguel A. De La Torre, prolific author on Hispanic religiosity
- Agustin Roman, retired auxiliary bishop of Miami
- Braulio Orue-Vivanco, former bishop of Pinar del Río
- Eduardo Tomas Boza-Masvidal, former auxiliary bishop of Havana
- Félix Varela, beatified priest, candidate for sainthood
- Jaime Lucas Ortega y Alamino, cardinal archbishop of Havana
- Meyer Rosenbaum, former rabbi and spiritual leader in Havana

== Royalty and nobility ==
- Maria Teresa, Grand Duchess of Luxembourg
- Edelmira Ignacia Adriana Sampedro-Robato, countess of Covadonga, first wife of Alfonso Prince of Asturias
- Marta Ester Rocafort-Altazarra, second wife of Alfonso Prince of Asturias

== Military ==
- Adolfo Fernández Cavada, captain in the Union Army during the American Civil War who later served as commander-in-chief of the Cinco Villas during Cuba's Ten Year War
- Alberto Bayo y Giroud, Cuban military leader of the defeated left-wing Loyalists in the Spanish Civil War
- Antonio Maceo Grajales, second-in-command of the Cuban army of independence
- Arnaldo Ochoa, Cuban general
- Calixto García, Cuban soldier in the Ten Years' War
- Carlos Manuel de Céspedes, Cuban general in the war of independence against the Spanish
- Eliseo Reyes Rodríguez, Cuban guerrillero
- Emilio Mola Vidal (1887–1937), Nationalist commander during the Spanish Civil War (1936–39); known for coining the phrase "fifth column"
- Federico Fernández Cavada, colonel in the Union Army during the American Civil War; later commander-in-chief of all the Cuban forces during Cuba's Ten Year War
- Jesús Sosa Blanco, captain in the Cuban army under Fulgencio Batista
- José Braulio Alemán, Cuban general in the Spanish–American War
- José Miguel Gómez, Cuban general in the war of independence against the Spanish
- Julius Peter Garesché, lieutenant colonel in the Union Army who served as chief of staff, with the rank of lieutenant colonel to Maj. Gen. William S. Rosecrans
- Loreta Janeta Velazquez, a.k.a. "Lieutenant Harry Buford", Velazquez was a Cuban-born woman who masqueraded as a male Confederate soldier during the Civil War
- Manuel Artime, leader of the Bay of Pigs invasion in 1961
- Máximo Gómez, 19th-century leader of Cuban forces in the wars of independence
- Pedro Luis Diaz Lanz, chief air force commander and member of Operation 40
- Víctor Dreke, Communist leader and a general in the Revolutionary Armed Forces
- Tomás Diez Acosta, revolutionary soldier and historian
- Víctor Ivo Acuña Velázquez, military commander
- Pilar Garcia, pre-revolutionary Chief of National Police

== Science ==
- Luis Alvarez, winner of the 1968 Nobel Prize in Physics, worked on the Manhattan Project
- Agustin Walfredo Castellanos, physician
- Carlos Juan Finlay, epidemiologist, proposed the mode of transmission of yellow fever and was instrumental in assisting Walter Reed with his studies in Cuba
- Juan Gundlach, 19th century naturalist and taxonomist
- Celia Hart, physicist
- Arnaldo Tamayo Méndez, first Cuban cosmonaut and the first person from a country in the Western Hemisphere other than the U.S. to travel to space
- Hilda Molina, former chief neurosurgeon in Cuba
- Felipe Poey, zoologist
- Oscar Luis Amoedo Valdes, father of forensic odontology

== Other categories ==
- Sebastian Arcos Bergnes, human rights activist
- Rosa Castellanos, military nurse
- Ramón Castro, older brother of Fidel and Raúl Castro
- Mirta Diaz-Balart, Fidel Castro's first wife
- Enriqueta García y Martín, prominent Cuban socialite, businesswoman and landowner
- Delfín Fernández, high ranking government official, defected to Spain
- Gregorio Fuentes, nautical captain
- Elián González, boy who came to the US, leading to a custody battle between his American family and his father in Cuba
- Jose Miguel Battle, Sr., former godfather of the Cuban Mafia
- Antonio Sánchez de Bustamante y Sirven, judge of the Permanent Court of International Justice at the Hague
- Dr. Eduardo J. Padrón, educator and college president
- Jesús Permuy, human rights activist, architect, urban planner, community leader
- Ignacio José Urrutia (1730–1795), historian
- Nitza Villapol, chef

== Non-resident Cubans ==
- (United States) List of Cuban-Americans
- (Mexico) List of Cuban-Mexicans
- (United Kingdom) Dane Bowers
- (United Kingdom) Guillermo Cabrera Infante
- (United Kingdom) Yat-Sen Chang
- (United Kingdom) Sienna Guillory
- (United Kingdom) William Montagu (Yznaga)
- (United Kingdom) Consuelo Yznaga
- (Italy) Taismary Agüero
- (Italy) Mirka Francia
- (Italy) Libania Grenot
- (Italy) Magdelín Martínez
- (Venezuela) Alex Cabrera
- (Venezuela) Majandra Delfino
- (Venezuela) Viviana Gibelli
- (Canada) Arturo Miranda
- (Canada) Eduardo Sebrango
- (Puerto Rico) Bárbara Bermudo
- (Puerto Rico) Mike Lowell
- (Puerto Rico) Carlos Ponce
- (Jamaica) Rita Marley
- (Jamaica) Ziggy Marley
- (Denmark) Lenny Martinez
- (France) Mariane Pearl
- (Guatemala) Oscar Isaac

== See also ==
- List of people by nationality
