= Yumurí =

Yumurí may refer to:

- Yumurí River, river in Cuba, which drains into Bahia de Matanzas, an arm of the Straits of Florida in the historic provincial capital of Matanzas
- Yumurí, Cuban opera by Eduardo Sánchez (composer)
- Moisés Valle (Yumurí) leader of the band Yumurí y sus Hermanos since 1992
