= Richard Barnbrook =

British politician (1961–2026)

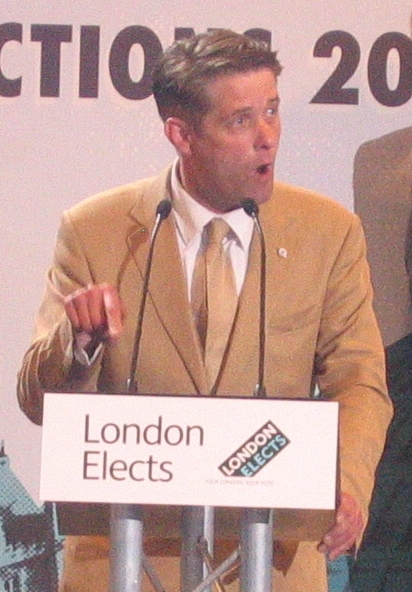
- Barnbrook in 2008

Member of the London Assembly as an additional member
- In office 1 May 2008 – 3 May 2012
- Preceded by: Damian Hockney
- Succeeded by: Fiona Twycross

Councillor & Opposition Leader for Barking and Dagenham London Borough Council
- In office 5 May 2006 – 7 May 2010
- Ward: Goresbrook

Leader of the British National Party in the London Assembly
- In office 1 May 2008 – 13 August 2010
- Preceded by: Office established
- Succeeded by: None

Personal details
- Born: 24 February 1961 Catford, London, England
- Died: March 2026 (aged 65)
- Party: Labour Party (until 1999); British National Party (1999–2010); Independent (2010–2012)
- Education: Royal Academy of Arts
- Profession: Teacher, sculptor

Richard Barnbrook (24 February 1961 – March 2026) was a British politician who served as a member of the London Assembly. He was elected as a British National Party (BNP) list candidate in the 2008 election, though he resigned the BNP whip in August 2010 and subsequently sat as an independent. Barnbrook was a councillor, and leader (2006–08), then deputy leader (2008–10), of the BNP group on Barking and Dagenham London Borough Council. He represented Goresbrook ward. Barnbrook retired from politics in May 2012, having been the BNP's only ever London Assembly member.

== Background ==
Barnbrook was born in Catford on 24 February 1961. He had his first public art exhibition, of landscape watercolours, in 1971. In 1981 he attended an art foundation course for a year at Grimsby College of Technology.

From 1982 to 1985, he studied at the Royal Academy of Arts, where he obtained a first class diploma. During that time he attended Limoges College of Art and Craft on a minor scholarship and while there gained his first lecturing position (1984). He was awarded an interim Master of Arts degree from the California Institute of Arts and a PGCE from Greenwich University. In 1985, Barnbrook won a research and lecturing UNESCO scholarship to Silpakorn University in Thailand. He went on to lecture in Thailand, Europe and across the USA. In 1989, he was awarded an EC Film Award (fellowship) from Braunschweig University of Art in Germany. He completed his studies in 1995.

He then worked as an artist and art teacher/lecturer. His art projects included writing and directing the theatre piece Human Soup and the film HMS Discovery: A Love Story, the latter of which received substantial media coverage as a result of its scenes of male nudity and homoerotic themes, and which was described as "gay pornography", but which Barnbrook insisted was nothing more than an art film and certainly not homoerotic. In 2000, Barnbrook set up and was appointed managing director and artistic designer to the Jubilee Woods Trust, which he established to create new woodland plantations with the theme of environment, education and art, one for every county in the UK, to mark the Queen's Golden Jubilee, to which Sting was one of the principal benefactors and Sir David Attenborough showed support. Barnbrook received acclaim for his designs for heraldic planting formations, but only one of these came to fruition in Sefton, north Liverpool. When Barnbrook's connections with the BNP came to public notice, Barnbrook was dismissed before the project could be completed, and none of his other designs were commissioned.

== Politics ==
Previously an activist for the Labour Party, Barnbrook joined the BNP in 1999. He was a BNP candidate in the 2005 general election. He received 4,916 votes (16.9%) in Barking coming third and only 27 votes behind the Conservative candidate, Keith Prince. The constituency was won by Margaret Hodge.

Barnbrook was the BNP's candidate for the 2008 London mayoral election, receiving 69,710 first preference votes (2.84% of the total valid first preference votes cast) and 128,609-second preference votes (5.23% of the total valid second preference votes cast).

In the separate London-wide Assembly vote he was the top candidate on the BNP's London-wide Assembly Member list. The BNP list received 130,714 votes or 5.33% of the total valid votes cast; this won them one seat in the London Assembly which was filled by Barnbrook.

Barnbrook challenged for the leadership of the BNP in July 2010 but, like the other challengers, Butler and Adams, failed to obtain the very large number of nominations required of a challenger to trigger an election. Barnbrook resigned the BNP whip in August 2010, following his demand for an inquiry into allegations of corruption and fiscal mismanagement against the party leadership. He was then expelled from the party and, from August 2010 to 2012 sat in the London Assembly as an independent member. While a member of the BNP he voted in favour of allowing minorities to join the party membership.

When Barnbrook's term as a member of the Greater London Assembly expired in May 2012 he did not seek re-election.

=== Standards Committees hearings ===
In September 2008, Barnbrook appeared in an interview in which he was asked about knife crime. The interview appeared on his website, YouTube and his blog on the Daily Telegraph website. Barnbrook states during the recording that "In Barking and Dagenham alone three weeks ago, there was a murder of a young girl. We don't know who's done it, her girlfriend was attacked inside an educational institute. Again, two weeks ago there was another attack by knives on the streets of Barking and Dagenham where two people were murdered." Councillor Valerie Rush subsequently complained to the Greater London Authority that she knew the statements to be false as the alleged murders never happened, and accused Barnbrook of bringing his office into disrepute. In May 2009, a joint investigation by the Greater London Authority and Barking and Dagenham council concluded that Barnbrook had brought "his office and the respective authorities into disrepute" as a result of the interview.

A hearing held by the standards committees of both the assembly and council was adjourned on 21 July 2009 when Barnbrook failed to appear, after being given sick leave on grounds of stress. He had also failed to provide written evidence. On 24 September 2009, Barnbrook was suspended for one month from Barking and Dagenham Council for bringing it into disrepute. Barnbrook said he had made "unintentional inaccuracies" in the interview on knife crime due to his dyslexia and background noise. He subsequently posted an apology on his blog which stated: "I apologise for giving out this information based on anecdotal reports and thereafter for not ensuring that the videos were removed or at least amended, once I knew the information to be incorrect. I have a passionate interest in the scourge of knife-crime which affects our whole community and will continue to speak out on the issue. I have no wish, however, to stoke fear of crime and realise the importance of conveying accurate information. I will seek to work far more closely with the Police and other agencies in future to ensure that I am able to do this".

Barnbrook appealed against the outcome of the earlier hearings. He was represented by Patrick Harrington (the General Secretary of Solidarity – The Union for British Workers, acting in a personal capacity) at the appeal and Mr James Goudie QC acted for the London Borough of Barking & Dagenham. The appeal was heard on 21 January 2010 and the decision announced on 18 February 2010. At the hearing, Harrington made a number of submissions on behalf of the appellant. Two cases were cited:- Mullaney –v- The Adjudication Panel for England [2009] EWHC 72 (Admin) and Livingstone -v- The Adjudication Panel for England [2006] EWHC 2533 (Admin).

Harrington's key argument was that Barnbrook at any one time wears three hats: the first for his political position within the BNP, the second as Assembly member for the GLA, and the third of LBBD Councillor. Sometimes the boundaries between these three functions became blurred, according to Harrington. In relation to the video the appellant was not acting in his capacity as a councillor. When Barnbrook made reference to Barking and Dagenham it was by way of an illustration in the same way as he had cited incidents that had occurred in other parts of England. The Tribunal agreed with Harrington. It "concluded that the Appellant was not conducting the business of the Authority nor acting or claiming to act as a representative of the Authority. While there is reasoning which could lead the Tribunal to find that the Appellant was acting in his capacity as a councillor or was giving the impression that he was representing the Authority, there are also contrary arguments, and on balance, the Tribunal has concluded that the Appellant was not, on the particular facts, so doing."

They went on to say that "The Tribunal therefore came to the conclusion that the Appellant's actions of appearing in the video and posting it on the web do not fall within section 2 of the Code and therefore the Code has not been engaged and no finding in respect of disrepute can be supported".

On this basis the Tribunal ruled:

"In view of the Tribunal’s finding that the Code of Conduct had not been engaged any findings reached by the Standards Committee (and whether or not adjudged by this Tribunal as being supported by evidence) are now without basis. The Appellant’s appeal against the findings and sanction are therefore upheld."

Earlier in the hearing the Counsel for the GLA and Harrington had reached an agreement whereby Barnbrook's apology was accepted, he accepted a technical breach of the code and no sanctions were imposed. Counsel for the GLA made it clear that it had never been part of their case that Richard Barnbrook had intentionally given out false information.

== Art history ==
Barnbrook's major painting and installation exhibitions between 1971 and 2009 include:

- 1971 British Landscapes, UK. Collection of landscape scenes in watercolours, shown at Roper Gallery, Immingham, Lincolnshire.
- 1980 Interiors, UK; three landscape paintings, oil on canvas, York Art Gallery, York.
- 1983 Landscapes, France; four scholarship pieces in oils on canvas, Limoges College of Art and Crafts, Limoges.
- 1985 Final Year Show, UK; six large landscape paintings in oils, Royal Academy of Arts Galleries, Burlington House, Piccadilly, London.
- 1985 Moving Out (The Fallen Angel), UK; Paintings, ink on photographic paper, in collaboration with Bruce McLean in his studios, Coin Street, Waterloo, London.
- 1986 Neither Fish Nor Flesh, Thailand; Collection of landscape diptychs, acrylic on Thai paper glued to stretched canvas, Visual Dhamma Gallery, Bangkok.
- 1987 Brass Woods, UK; Collection of six 2m woodland landscape scenes, etchings on brass, Goldsmith's Gallery, London.
- 1987 Lying Truth, UK; Land installation in mixed media, paper, wood and bricks, Hercules Fisherman Studio, Coin Street, Waterloo, London.
- 1990 Exile and the Kingdom, Germany; Collection of A3 framed mixed media sketches and paintings in black and white, shown at Kampnagel Centre for International Contemporary Art, Hamburg.
- 1990 Subculture, Germany; Installations of wood and plastics with framed sketches of landscapes, Galerie Gruppe Grun, Fedelhoren 32, 28 Bremen.
- 1991 Wall House, Germany; Light installation with wood and glass, Ralph Kull Studios, Hannover.
- 1992 Blue Art, USA; Sculpture installation, cobalt blue glass, copper and polished stone, Dr Stuck Gallery, Chelsea, New York.
- 1993 Cone Tree, Germany; Sculptures, copper and fibreglass, shown at Galerie Kornbrennerei, Bertramstrasse, 4A, 3000, Hanover.
- 1993 Blue Art 2, France; Circular floor installation of cobalt blue pigment, Limoges College of Art and Crafts, Limoges.
- 1994 Without Title, USA; Collection of six 1m watercolours of skyscapes in blues, shown at Richard Bernstein Studios, Chelsea Hotel, New York.
- 1994 Genesis, Greece; Sculptures in white marble shown at Montgomery Sculpture Trust, Makry Gialos, Crete.
- 1995 The Heart of the Past, USA; Wall installations, wax and pins shown at Calarts Gallery, Valencia, California.
- 1996 Victorian Views, Germany; Collection of paintings, acrylic on canvas, shown at Galerie Gruppe Grun, Fedelhoren 32, 28 Bremen.
- 1996 English Gardens, USA; Collection of 12 close-up landscape paintings, oil on canvas, shown at Munster Gallery, New Jersey.
- 1997 Shadows of the Past, UK; Installation and paintings, stretched photographic paper, black ink and pencil with three-dimensional objects made from corrugated cardboard, plywood, with black, white and blue acrylic paint shown at Hercules Fisherman Studios, Coin Street, Waterloo, London.
- 1999 The Untitled, USA; Installation of electric lights, glass, steel and ground cobalt pigment shown at Munster Gallery, New Jersey.
- 2004 Head to Head, Germany; Landscape installation in mixed media of papier mache, wood and black and white boulders, shown at Ralph Kull Galerie, Bremen.
- 2009 Landscape in Light, Germany; A collection of 6 sky-scape watercolours, on stretched framed paper; mixed media of watercolours, watercolour-pencils, charcoal and B pencils shown at Buro 34, Gestaltung Beratung, Haspelmath Strasse 12, Hanover.

Film, theatre and video installations between 1993–1988 include:

- 1988 Human Soup, UK. Theatre production with paintings, Riverside Studios, Crisp Road, Hammersmith, London.
- 1989 HMS Discovery, UK; 57 minute film in 8mm and 16mm, first shown at London Institute of Film, Camden.
- 1990 Passage of Love, Germany; 93 minute film in 35mm, first shown as part of the German Film Festival at Buro 34 Gestaltung Beratung, Haspelmath, Strasse 12, Hanover.
- 1993 Proposed letter to my father, Germany; short video, first shown at Ralph Kull Galerie, Bremen.

Designs for shows and spectaculars:

- 1996 Tower, UK.
- 1997 Phoenix, USA;
- 2000 Millennium Spectacular, UK;
- 2000 Meridian Beam, UK;
- 2002 52 designs for the Jubilee Woods Trust, UK;

The majority of Barnbrook's art work focuses on the theme of landscape, either by representation or choreography and cinemagraphics and much of his output has been characterised by his particular penchant for the environment and his interpretive response to the natural world. This is particularly evident in his large scale water-colours, which together with sculpture, are his favoured media.

== Personal life and death ==
Barnbrook married an American in 1998; the couple separated in 2004 due to personal differences and were divorced in 2008.

He was engaged to the ballerina Simone Clarke. However, in August 2008, it was reported that he had been seeing a Finnish nurse, Annika Tavilampi, whom he had met over the Internet. The relationship has since ended. In statements made before he met Clarke, however, Barnbrook was quoted as saying, concerning her relationship with Yat-Sen Chang and their daughter, Olivia, "I'm not opposed to mixed marriages but their children are washing out the identity of this country's indigenous people." He later said that, should he and Clarke get married, "her child will be my child". In November 2008, he stated that they were no longer engaged.

Barnbrook died in March 2026, aged 65. His death was not publicly announced until 15 August.

== Elections contested ==
UK Parliament elections

Date of election	Constituency	Party	Votes	%
2005	Barking	BNP	4,916	16.9

London Mayoral elections

Date of election	Party	1st Preference votes	%	2nd Preference votes	%	Results
2008	BNP	69,710	2.84	128,609	5.23	Not elected

London Assembly elections (Entire London city)

Date of election	Party	Votes	%	Results	Notes
2004	BNP	90,365	4.71	Not elected	Multi-members party list
2008	BNP	130,714	5.3	Elected	Multi-members party list
