= Juan Valdés =

Juan Valdés may refer to:

- Juan de Valdés (c. 1490 – 1541), Spanish theologian
- Juan de Valdés Carasquilla, Spanish engraver of the Baroque period
- Juan Valdés Figueroa (born 1957), Cuban diplomat
- Juan de Valdés Leal (1622–1690), Spanish painter and etcher
- Juan Valdés Rodríguez (1936–2008), Chilean politician
- Juan Gabriel Valdés (born 1947), Chilean political scientist, diplomat and politician
- Juan Pablo Valdés (born 1983), Argentine politician

== See also ==
- Juan Valdez (disambiguation)
