= Juan Valdez (disambiguation) =

Juan Valdez is an advertising character, portrayed as a Colombian coffee farmer.

Juan Valdez also may refer to:

- Juan Valdez Cafe, coffeehouse chain elaborating on the coffee promotion
- Real human individuals:
  - Juan Valdez (governor) (fl. 1710), governor of Spanish colonial Texas
  - Juan Valdez (activist) (1938–2012), American land grant advocate
  - Juan Valdez (U.S. Marine) (fl. 1970s), noted as last American evacuee from roof of Saigon embassy
  - Juan Valdez (footballer) (born 1983), Aruban athlete

== See also ==
- Juan Valdés (disambiguation)
- Valdez (disambiguation)
