= Luis Castaneda =

Cuban photographer (born 1943)

Spanish: Luis Castañeda
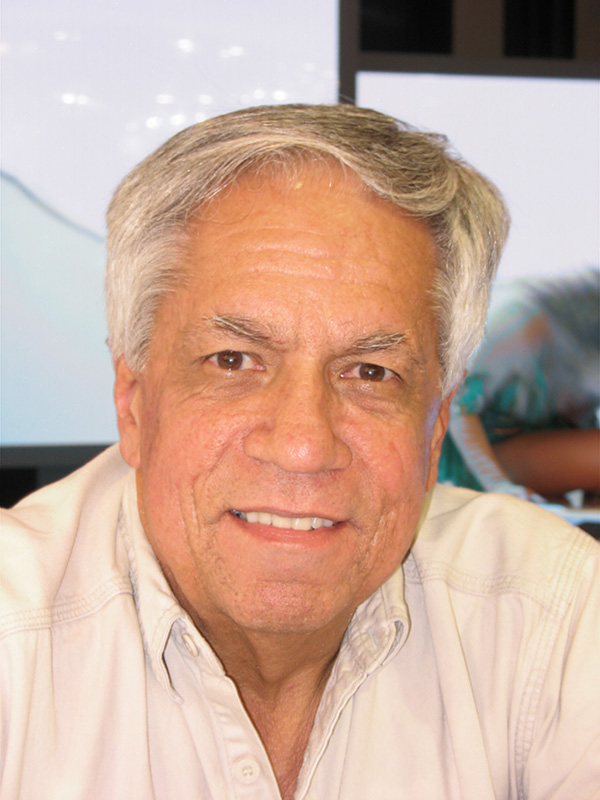
- Born: 29 July 1943; Havana, Cuba
- Occupation: photographer

Luis Castaneda (esp. Luis Castañeda) (born 29 July 1943 in Havana, Cuba) – Cuban landscape photographer.

== Biography ==
From 1964 through 1979, Castaneda cooperated as photographer with Ballet Nacional de Cuba, Teatro Musical de La Habana, the Ministry of Culture, and also as a freelancer photographed for publishers such as Cuba Magazine.

In 1979, Castaneda moved to Spain, and, having started working in "The Image Bank" stock agency, travelled over the whole of Europe. Before 1985, he also collaborated with Spanish periodical publishers, as well as with some government organizations, including the Ministry of Tourism, Radio Televisión Española and The Madrid City Hall. For his "tourist" images Luis Castaneda received the "Ortiz-Echagüe" Award.

In 1986, Castaneda left Spain and moved to Miami, Florida, USA, where he currently lives. He has worked with The National Fund for Advancement in the Arts, several Ballet companies like Miami City Ballet, Ballet Concerto, Ballet Etudes, Spanish Ballet Rosita Segovia, and with South Florida theaters "The Coconut Grove", Theater and Teatro Avante.

Castaneda's work has been published in various publications. He has published three books and had international exhibitions. His photo articles have been published in magazines Leica Fotografie Intl. (Germany), Leica Magazine (Italia), Popular Photography (China), Panasonic NEWS (Switzerland), Foto & Video (Russia), Photoworld (China). He edits regular rubric in Popular Photography magazine (Beijing). Camera manufacturers Panasonic, Hasselblad, Leica and Minox use Castaneda's images for advertising purposes.

In 1993, Castaneda received "Master of the Leica" Award. In 1998, on photokina exhibition in Cologne (Germany) he was offered to enter the Italian "Gruppo Fotografico Leica". He was also awarded "Golden Eye of Russia" prize by International Guild of Russian Media professional photographers (2006).

He is widely known for his image series of Iceland landscapes, made with the Panasonic Lumix LX5 compact camera.

Castaneda uses Leica and Panasonic LUMIX cameras and all lenses from ultra-wide to super-tele range.

Castaneda holds master classes and photo seminars.

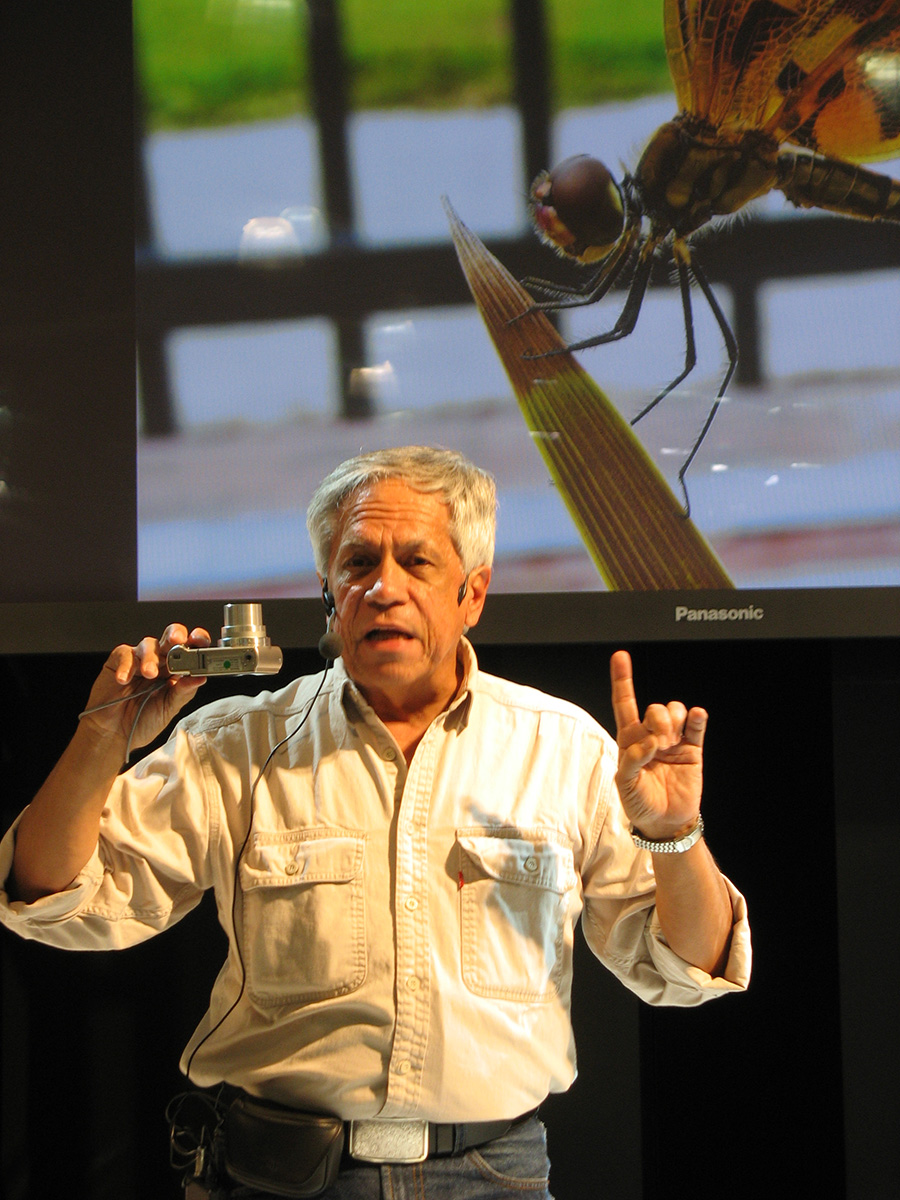
Castaneda's performance on Photoforum – 2008

== Bibliography ==
- "Sentir España” (To Feel Spain) (Spain. 1989)
- "Mayab: donde la piedra se hizo poesia” (Mayab: where poetry is written in stone) (Mexico. 1991)
- "Beyond the Vision" (Master Class of Photographic Inspiration and Technique) (China. 2011)
