= Three Guys from Miami =

Group of American chefs and food writers

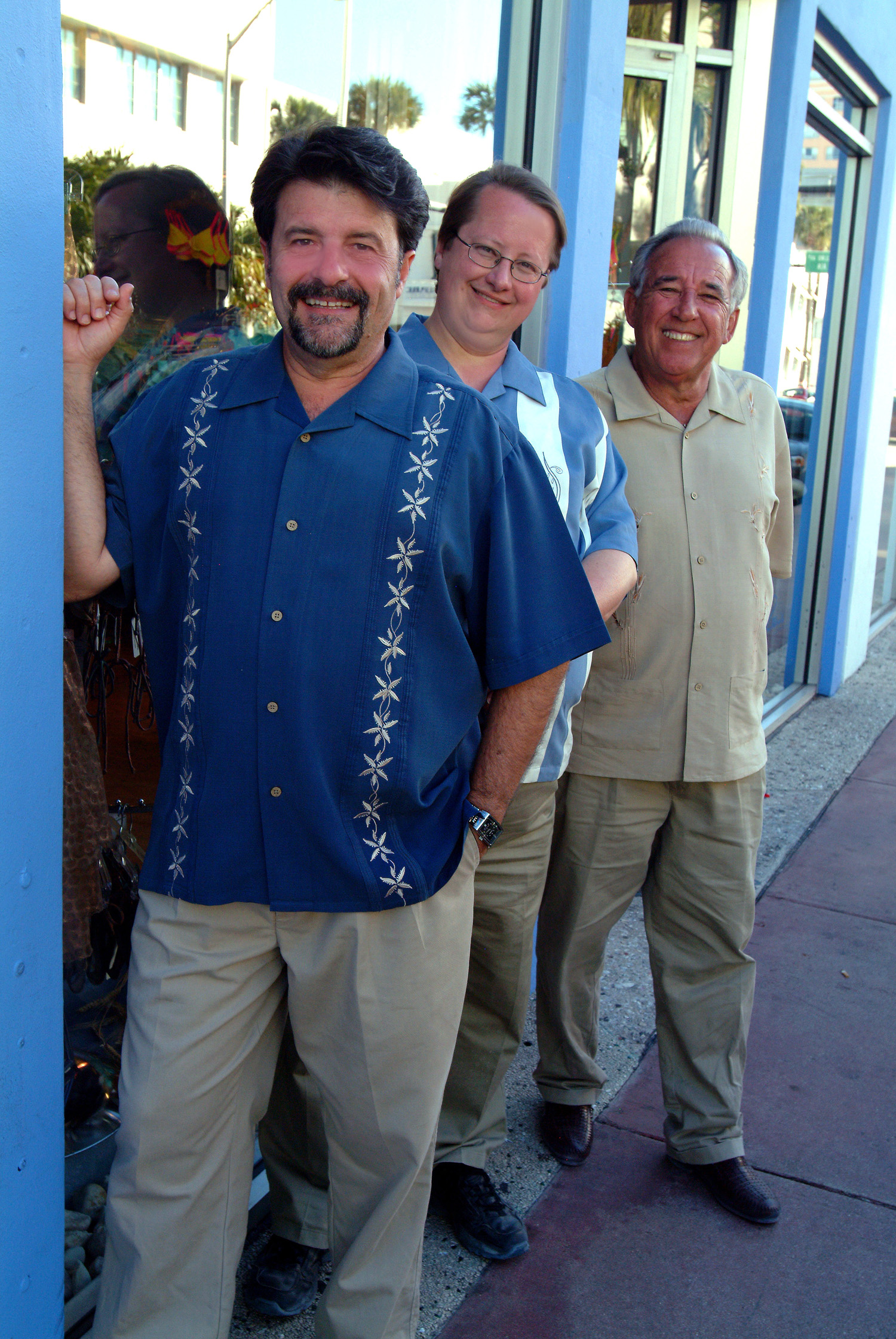
The Three Guys From Miami on the streets in South Beach. (l to r) Jorge Castillo, Glenn Lindgren, and Raul Musibay.

The Three Guys From Miami—Raúl Musibay, Glenn Lindgren, and Jorge Castillo—are chefs and food writers. They provide Cuban cooking tips and advice for professional and amateur chefs. Their recipes have been included in several cookbooks, newspapers, and national magazines.

Their website iCuban.com debuted in 1996 and logged more than 5 million visitors in its first fifteen years.

== Media appearances ==
The Three Guys From Miami were featured in a public television documentary, "La Cocina Cubana: Secretos de mi Abuela".

They also have made several appearances on the Food Network, had a cooking show on Miami public television have appeared on the Travel Channel, and are frequent guests on National Public Radio (All Things Considered). They are authors of the books Three Guys From Miami Cook Cuban and Three Guys From Miami Celebrate Cuban.

== Personnel ==
Raúl Musibay went to the United States via Spain in 1980. A full-time Miami resident, Musibay is a proponent of traditional Cuban cuisine and an advocate of preserving Cuban culture in the United States.

Glenn Lindgren grew up in Minneapolis and first went to Miami in 1984, where he began his studies in Cuban and Latin cuisine. Lindgren is the writer of the group; he writes about the Three Guys From Miami in books, magazines, and on the Internet. He is an accomplished chef and author.

Jorge Castillo went to the United States via the Mariel Boatlift in 1980. Although born and raised in Cayo la Rosa, Jorge left Miami after three months to live in Iowa, where he mastered the English language and learned Midwest cooking techniques.
