= Mario Chanes de Armas =

Cuban revolutionary (1927–2007)

Mario Chanes de Armas (October 25, 1927 in Havana, Cuba – February 24, 2007 in Hialeah, Florida) was a former Cuban revolutionary and ally of Fidel Castro. He was a veteran of the attack on the Moncada barracks in July 1953 and served time in Batista's New Model Prison on the Isle of Pines with fellow revolutionary Fidel Castro. After Castro's rise to power, he was labeled an enemy of the regime and imprisoned for almost 30 years.

== Background ==
Chanes de Armas was one of a number of revolutionaries closely aligned to Castro during the battle against the Fulgencio Batista regime in Cuba, that felt that the influence of the Communist party of Cuba was threatening to betray Castro's initial promises of constitutional reform.

As Castro continued to reject calls for elections in the months after the revolution, opining that they would usher in a return to "the old discredited system of corrupt parties and fraudulent balloting which marked the Batista era", Chanes de Armas became increasingly active in the opposition movement against the new government. For these activities he was sentenced and imprisoned on charges of "counter-revolution".

According to The Economist's obituary of de Armas:

In 1961 he returned to the Isle of Pines. His crime was "counter-revolution". He was said to have tried to assassinate Mr Castro, but he denied that he had ever been enlisted. The falling-out was personal and ideological. His face had now been airbrushed out of the photographs in which he smiled as Fidel's friend.

Prison was much less comfortable than before. That spring the Isle of Pines had been sown with dynamite, linked up to the wiring system in the prison, so that any American attempt to rescue the prisoners would blow them to smithereens. It was, Mr Chanes de Armas remembered, "like sleeping on a powder keg". Prisoners—in 1961, around 6,000 of them—were meant to submit to communist "re-education"; he became the leader of those who resisted. He refused to wear the blue uniform of a common criminal, instead going naked or in underpants. He took part in forced labour as slowly as he could, digging ditches or chopping up blocks of marble in the fierce, dripping Cuban heat. For weeks at a time he was put in tapiadas, steel isolation cells, and gavetas, "drawers", so narrow that he could only stand. He and his followers were called plantados, planted squarely—though sparsely—as trees across Mr Castro's path.

He was in prison for one day short of 30 years.

It's been argued that Chanes de Armas was imprisoned longer than any political prisoner anywhere. In 1993 he was permitted to leave for Miami. He died on February 24, 2007, aged 80. In a number of respects his life story resembles that of Gustavo Arcos - another veteran of the attack on Moncada Barracks.
