= Mayra Verónica =

Cuban-American singer, model, actress, and TV host

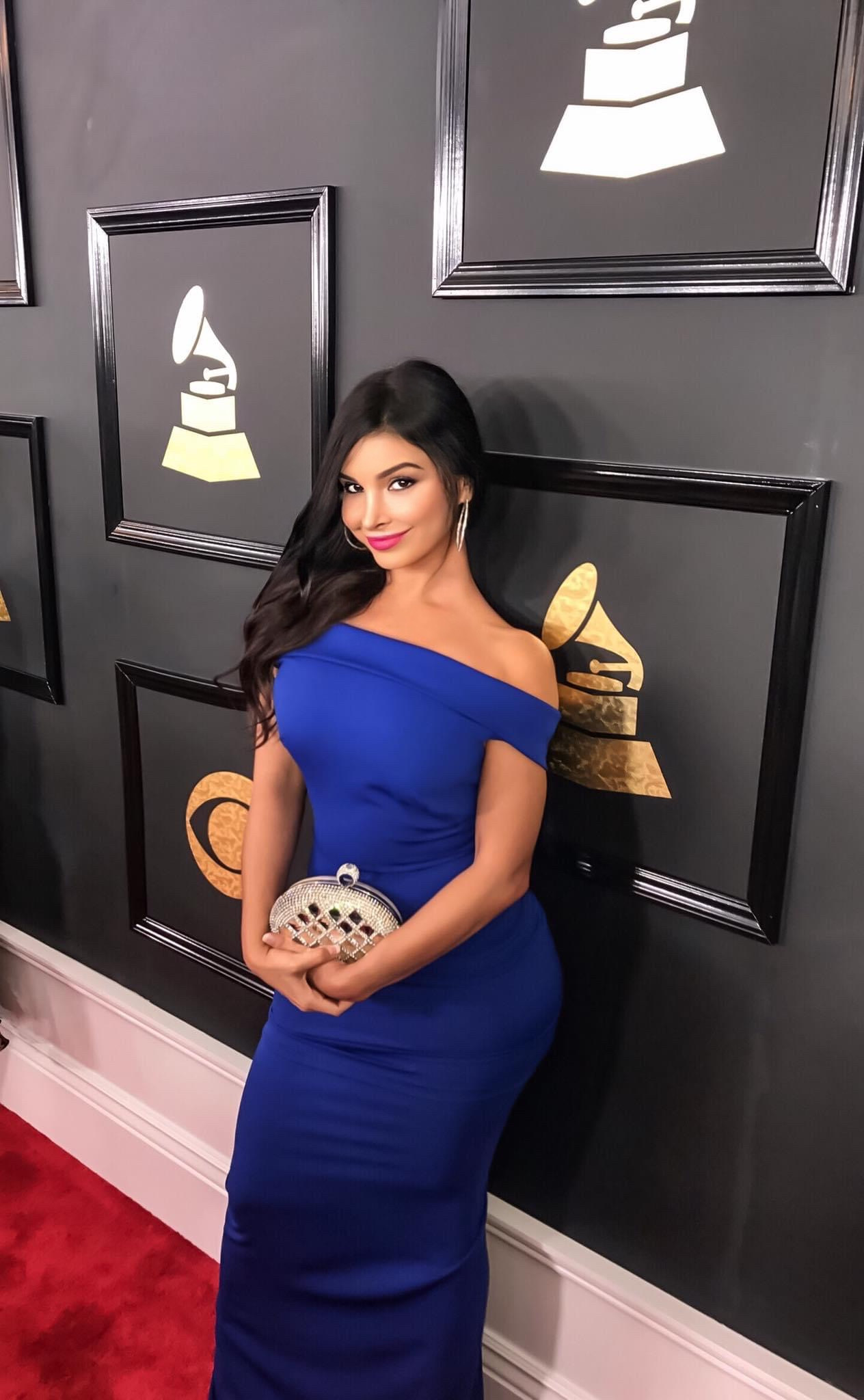
- Verónica in 2021
- Born: Mayra Verónica Aruca Rodríguez; 20 August 1980 (age 46); Havana, Cuba
- Occupations: Singer; model; actress; television personality
- Parents: Arturo Aruca (father); Mayra Rodriguez (mother)
- Modeling information
- Height: 5 ft 3 in (1.60 m)
- Musical career
- Label: Syco

Mayra Verónica Aruca Rodríguez (born August 20, 1980) is a Cuban singer, actress, model and television public figure who became popular for her appearances on Spanish-language television. Verónica's role in Univision's Don Francisco Presenta brought her to the attention of FHM magazine's US edition. After appearing in FHM, she went on to do additional magazine work. She has taken part in many Spanish-language television shows, as well as appearing in music videos and television commercials.

In 2012, Verónica signed an exclusive worldwide co-publishing deal with BMG Chrysalis in the US. In 2013, she signed with Simon Cowell's label Syco Music (Sony Music). Her debut EP, "Mama Mia", was released on August 29, 2013, on Syco Music by Sony Music Entertainment UK. In 2015, Mayra Verónica signed a major record worldwide deal with Warner Bros. Records. The Cuban American's career has seen her grace the covers of Billboard magazine, FHM, Shape and Maxim, along with high-profile national ad campaigns with L'Oréal, Coca-Cola and Nike.

She is a spokeswoman for the USO and is the founder of MVA Entertainment Group, a company dedicated to the promotion, publicity and management of independent music artists.

== Early life ==
Mayra Verónica was born in Havana, Cuba, where her father was a member of one of Cuba's rock bands, Los Dada. At the age of six, she moved to Miami with her mother,

== Pageants and modeling ==
Verónica continued school, and after joining a local beauty pageant and becoming Ms. Miami, the photographer who covered the event was captivated by Mayra's photos, and invited her to his studio for free sessions. Thus, Mayra obtained her first modeling book and signed with a local agent in Miami. The agent sent her to an audition for a local TV entertainment news show "Miami Hoy" (at the time Mayra was at Florida International University majoring in psychology and theater). She did not know much about being a reporter but determined she could act like one.

She began as a correspondent but was promoted to celebrity hostess for Miami Hoy where she was seen writing, producing and editing her own segments as she interviewed a roster of celebrities, ranging from Donald Trump, Oscar de la Renta, Hugh Hefner, Marc Anthony and Dennis Rodman. Throughout, Verónica traveled to New York to continue acting training at the Lee Strasberg Institute to fine-tune her craft, until the station (owned by Media One) was bought by AT&T Corporation and subsequently closed.

After graduating from Florida International University with a major in psychology and a minor in business and theater, she turned to acting full time and moved to New York City to graduate from the famed Lee Strasberg Theatre and Film Institute. Mayra went on to star in feature roles in PBS productions and films such as Tumbe, The Suitor and National Lampoon's Pledge This!.

Verónica landed a made-for-TV movie called The Suitor and did commercial campaigns for Nike, L'Oréal and Coca-Cola. Univision announced a new show hosted by Don Francisco with Verónica cast as the model and co-host. Known for her ample curves, she consented to having her last daily appearance focused on her backside before turning around to face the camera. Once the show aired, her signature feature became the talk of Latinos everywhere, so much so, the American press became interested.

== Cover girl ==
FHM, the top men's magazine of the time, contacted Verónica's publicist to ask for a feature spread on their magazine. Verónica agreed and after mail requesting her return, she went on to appear on the cover of the FHM exclusive collection book, which included top sex symbols of the decade such as Pamela Anderson, Eva Longoria and Carmen Electra. From 2004 to 2010, Mayra Verónica made FHM's "Sexiest Women in the World" list six years in a row. She was featured on other covers for FHM, Billboard magazine, Maxim, Edge, GQ, Cosmo, Shape, and over 100 other national and international covers. Her popularity on such covers made her website one of the top traffic websites, with more than 4 million hits biweekly. With her popularity came emails from soldiers stationed in Iraq asking for her posters and, by now, famous calendars. Verónica's management sent a care package of approximately 5,000 posters. Shortly thereafter, the military named her the favorite pin-up girl for the US Marines and the USO asked her to tour with the troops.

== USO tours ==
The USO tour became a special Thanksgiving tour with Vice Chairman of the Joint Chiefs of Staff General James Cartwright, actor Wilmer Valderrama and comedian Russell Peters, traveling to six countries in six days: Iraq, Afghanistan, Germany, Turkey, Africa and Greenland. The troops' response was overwhelming and although Verónica had previously decided not to do any more calendars, she changed her mind and appeared on one in 2008, dedicating proceeds to the Wounded Warrior Project.

Upon her return from the tour, she was described as a "modern-day Betty Grable". Verónica continued touring with the USO and became an official spokesperson, appearing with then-President George W. Bush and Gary Sinise on a panel for C-SPAN about the organization.

On July 2, 2009, the New York Stock Exchange asked her to ring the NASDAQ bell for the Fourth of July week. Verónica decided to bring awareness to two of the organizations for which she's an advocate and spokesperson, the USO and UNICEF, and brought them to the bell-ringing ceremony.

Verónica continued her work with the troops by visiting the wounded at Camp Lejeune.

== Music ==
Mayra Verónica collaborated on her first album with Univision Network in 2007, which was titled Vengo Con To (Comin' At Ya With Everything). Performed in the musical style of reggaetón, Verónica's album included "Vengo Con To" of which King magazine said: "Verónica's moaning makes Madonna's Erotica sound like bubblegum pop... chew on that Daddy Yankee." The song charted in the Top 40 on Billboard, while the music video was reportedly banned from Latin television. The album's popularity landed Verónica a deal with Universal Motown, which put out a second single from the album titled "Mamma Mia". A third single, "Es Tan Dificil Olvidarte", dedicated to fallen troops, put Verónica in the top 10 on the pop contemporary charts. In 2014, Verónica's song "Mama Mia" was nominated for "Best Latin Dance Song of The Year" by the 29th Annual International Dance Music Awards (IDMA).

Verónica began 2010 on the cover of Billboard magazine with a new single, "If You Wanna Fly", that reached number 9 on Billboard's Hot Dance Club Play chart, number 11 on Billboard's Hot Dance Airplay chart, number 5 on Billboard Dance/Electronic sales, number 17 on Billboard Heatseekers Songs and number 74 Hot 100 Chart. She released an album titled Saint Nor Sinner in 2012. Mayra Verónica landed the cover of Billboard again in July 2011, for the release of her new single "Freak Like Me", which reached top 10 on the Billboard Hot Dance Club Charts. In March 2012, Mayra Verónica's video "Freak Like Me", featuring Antonio Sabato Jr. who plays Verónica's love interest, was added to MTV Hits & VHI Latin America on full rotation. Mayra Verónica also worked on a parody with actor Keenan Cahill for Freak Like me which garnered millions of online views.

Verónica's "Ay Mama Mia" The Remixes went number 1 on Billboard Magazine Hot Dance Club Play chart in March 2013. "Ay Mama Mia" was produced by Grammy-nominated producers, Dave Audé and Roy Tavaré. The video was directed by the Actor/Director Larenz Tate. The original Spanish music video reached over 12 million views on YouTube. "Ay Mama Mia" was signed to publishing at BMG Records and it was also "the official theme song for the new IFC Film The Sons of The Buena Vista Social Media Club Musica Cubana impacting theaters worldwide in 2013" The song became the most popular song on the video game Just Dance. A lot of Mayra Verónica's "Ay Mama Mia's" success was attributed to not just its sound but the influence of record executive Simon Cowell who signed Verónica and the winning song to his music label Syco Music in London.

Verónica's "MAMA YO!" came in later as a collaboration with the Italian Electro Swing band The Sweet Life Society. The production is a remake of Carmen Miranda's "Mama Yo Quero". The electro-house track debuted on the US Billboard Dance/Mix Show chart and saw success in Europe and North America. The music video has over 10 million combined views on YouTube. It was remixed with Sean Paul as a featured artist and renamed "Outta Control" before being released by BMG Records in 2016 together with Yolanda Be Cool Mayra Verónica continued to put out club/dance hits like Latin producer Sak Noel's "No Boyfriend No Problem" and Nils Van Zandt "Party Crasher" in 2018.

Mayra Verónica returned after the pandemic with a strong Latin beat. She released her percussive Tropical/Latin Spanish-language single on April 8, 2022 titled "VEN" cowritten by her and Cuban songwriter Carlos Celles. Verónica followed the release of "Ven" with a ballad titled "Que Mas", also co-written by her and Celles and produced by Gustavo Farias, a multi-Grammy winner who has worked with Juan Gabriel, Marc Anthony, Paul Anka, Vicente Fernandez, Andrea Bocelli and Luis Fonsi.

== Discography ==
=== Studio albums ===
- 2007: Vengo Con To'
- 2012: Saint Nor Sinner (Unreleased)
- 2022: Ven

=== Singles ===
Year	Single	Peak chart positions				Album
Year	Single	Hot Dance Club Play	Hot Dance Airplay	Heatseeker Songs	Dance/Electronic Digital Songs	Album
2010	"If You Wanna Fly"	13	17	21	5	-
2011	"Freak Like Me"	3	18	–	28	-
2013	"Ay Mama Mia"	1	-	-	-	-
2014	"Mama Mia"	-	-	-	-	-
2014	"No Boyfriend (No Problem)" (with Sak Noel, DJ Kuba & Neitan; featured vocalist)	-	39	-	-	-
2015	"Mama Yo!"	-	-	-	-	-
2015	"Party Crasher" (with Nilz Van Zandt; featured vocalist)	-	-	-	-	-
2016	"Outta Control" (with Sean Paul, Yolanda Be Cool; featured vocalist)	-	-	-	-	-
2022	"VEN" (featured vocalist)	-	-	-	-	
"—" denotes a release that didn't chart.

=== Label signed ===
- 2013 Mama Mia: Syco Music/Sony Music UK (worldwide) Ultra Music (US & Canada)
- 2015 MAMA YO!: Warner Bros. Records Territory Worldwide licensed to excluding: disco: wax/Sony Music Scandinavia, EGO Music (Italy), Central Station Records/Universal Music Australia
- 2015 No Boyfriend: Sony Music (worldwide) Ultra Music (US)
- 2015 Officially signed an artist deal with Warner Bros. Records (worldwide)
- 2022 Officially signed a record deal with BMG Records (Worldwide)

== Filmography ==
Key
†	Denotes works that have not yet been released

=== Film ===
Year	Title	Role	Notes
2001	The Suitor	Lucy	
2006	Pledge This!	Stacy Williams	
2010	Tumbe	Marbella Thompson	Episodes: "Mayra Veronica visits Miami Season 48
2012	Miami Snow	Cindy	
2019	Just Dance	Self: Mayra Veronica	
2021	Booty and the Beast	The Beauty	
2023	Uncharitable		

=== Television ===
Year	Title	Role	Notes
2003	The 4th Annual Latin Grammy Awards	Self	Presenter
2004	Despierta America	Self	Episode dated 4 November 2004 (Nov 4, 2004) (as Mayra Veronica)
2002–2012	Don Francisco Presenta	Co- Host/ Model	(TV Special) – Self – Co-Host (as Mayra Veronica)
2007	The Factor	Self	Episode dated 13 December 2007
2009	Hannity	Panelist	7 episodes
2012	New Now Next Awards	Nerea	17 episodes
2012	13th Annual Latin Grammy Awards	Herself (host)	(TV Special) – Self (as Mayra Veronica)
2013	The Tonight Show with Jay Leno	Self	(TV Series) – Performer ("Freak Like Me") (2 episodes, 2013) Episode #21.128 (Apr 11, 2013) Season 21, Episode 128 – Performer ("Freak Like Me") (uncredited) Episode #21.127 (Apr 10, 2013) Season 21, Episode 127 – Performer ("Freak Like Me") (uncredited)
2014	American Latino	Self	(TV Special) – Self (as Mayra Veronica) Episode #12.12 (Feb 3, 2014) Season 12, Episode 12 – Self (as Mayra Veronica)
2022	Good Day New York	Self	(TV Series) – Self (1 episode, 2022)

== See also ==
- List of famous Cubans
