= Ernesto Berúmen =

Mexican pianist

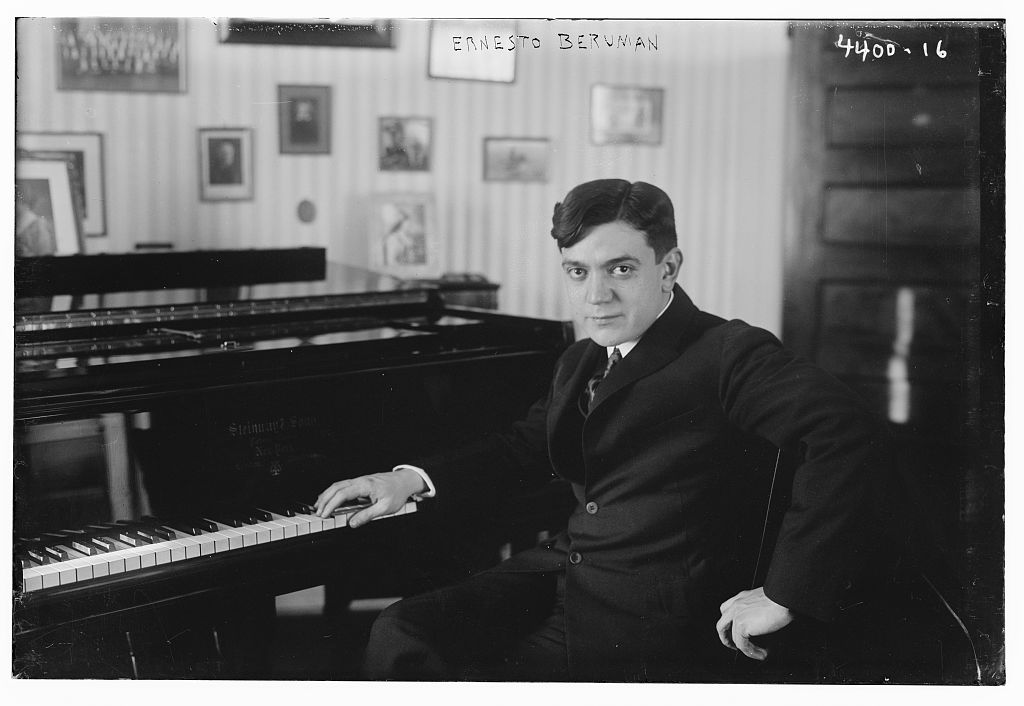
Ernesto Berumen in 1917

Ernesto Berúmen was a Mexican best known for his skill as a pianist. Berumen studied piano in Los Angeles, Paris, Leipzig and Vienna, settling in New York City in 1917, months before the United States entered World War I. In New York he was known for the annual concerts he gave at the city's Aeolian Hall. He is cited as an influential teacher of Cuban pianist Conchita Espinosa.
