= Jorge Castillo (chef) =

American chef

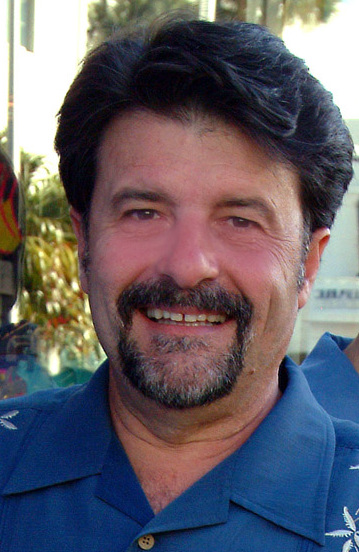
Jorge Castillo, 2004

Jorge G. Castillo is a Cuban-American chef and television personality. Born in Cayo la Rosa near Bauta, Cuba, Castillo came to the United States in the Mariel Boatlift of 1980. Castillo is a member of the Three Guys From Miami, a group that promotes Cuban culture and cuisine throughout the United States and Canada. The Three Guys From Miami have appeared in "Keith Famie's Adventures", in "Tyler's Ultimate" with Tyler Florence, and in "Christmas in America" with Rachael Ray, all on the Food Network They have also been featured on "The Splendid Table" on National Public Radio, "Sara's Secrets" with Sara Moulton on the Food Network, "Taste of America" with Mark DeCarlo on the Travel Channel, and in a Public Television documentary, "La Cocina Cubana: Secretos de mi Abuela" (The Cuban Kitchen: My Grandmother's Secrets).

The Three Guys From Miami are authors of the books "Three Guys From Miami Cook Cuban" ISBN 1-58685-433-X, and "Three Guys From Miami Celebrate Cuban" ISBN 1-4236-0063-0. Castillo and the Three Guys From Miami promote Cuban culture and the Cuban experience in the United States.
