= Simone Clarke =

English ballerina

Simone Clarke FDI, CDE, DIP Cecchetti (born 1970) is an English ballerina and former prima ballerina of English National Ballet company. She retired from professional dance in 2007 and opened her own school, the Yorkshire Ballet Academy, in Leeds in 2008.

== Early life ==
Clarke was born in Leeds, West Yorkshire, the daughter of Alfred Clarke, a maths teacher and Janet, a secretary. She was educated at a local Catholic school. Clarke left her home in Leeds at the age of 10 to begin training at the Royal Ballet School in London after winning one of 23 places sought by 4,500 entrants.

== Career ==
Clarke trained at the Royal Ballet School (1981–1988) and then joined the Birmingham Royal Ballet where she was promoted to first soloist in 1995. In 1998 she joined the English National Ballet. During the company's tour of China in 2000, she performed the role of Odette/Odile in Swan Lake as a guest dancer, and became senior soloist in that year. In 2003 she advanced to principal dancer. She has performed as Juliet in Romeo and Juliet, and as Cinderella and as Aurora in The Sleeping Beauty and the Dormouse in Alice in Wonderland.

Clarke has made several television appearances including Peter Wright's Coppelia and The Nutcracker, The Generation Game, Ballet Hell, Blue Peter and the lead ballerina in Men in Tights. She was the Equity trade union "dance representative" for the London region and, from November 2007, also an executive member of the trade union Solidarity.

In 2006, Clarke's name was on a list of British National Party members leaked by The Guardian newspaper when one of its journalists, Ian Cobain, posed as a member. Clarke defended her personal political affiliation, stating that "the BNP is the only party to take a stand against immigration". She faced calls to be sacked from the English National Ballet by the campaign group Unite Against Fascism, which believed it was inappropriate for a potential role model in a far-right party to be funded with public money. The Guardian later reported that Clarke had received "nearly 300 emails supporting me" since her membership became public, and PopMatters pointed out her views were actually at odds with party policy.

On 12 January 2007, around forty people staged a protest outside the London Coliseum theatre, where Clarke was to perform that night playing the lead in the romantic classic Giselle in her first performance since The Guardian reported on her BNP membership. The ENB said that her politics were a private matter and it had no mandate to comment on her views. Clarke was also supported by actors' union Equity, which said it was illegal to sack someone for their political beliefs.

In 2008, Clarke opened the Yorkshire Ballet Company, a private dance school, and went into teaching. She is a qualified Cochetti Method teacher.

== Personal life ==
Clarke was in a relationship with Yat-Sen Chang, an ENB dancer of Cuban-Chinese descent, with whom she has a daughter, Olivia Chang Clarke, an award-winning dancer. Clarke was briefly engaged to the artist and former BNP councillor Richard Barnbrook.
