= Glenn Lindgren =

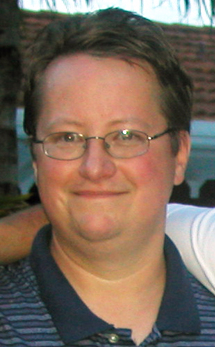
- Glenn Lindgren on the set of Tyler's Ultimate by Tyler Florence in Miami, 2002
- Born: February 9, 1955; Minneapolis, MN
- Died: September 16, 2017 (aged 62); Minnesota
- Culinary career
- Cooking style: Cuban, Latin American, Spanish, Swedish
- Television show(s): Food Network, "Tyler's Ultimate," The Travel Channel, Miami Public Television

Glenn Lindgren (born Glenn Michael Lindgren; February 9, 1955 - September 16, 2017) was a chef, food writer, and frequent guest on television and radio. He graduated from the University of St. Thomas in 1977. Lindgren was involved in the food, restaurant, and travel industries through the creation and management of four popular websites, as well as his establishment of Three Guys From Miami, an entertainment partnership promoting Cuban food and culture.

Lindgren is the author of two popular cookbooks: Three Guys From Miami Cook Cuban and Three Guys From Miami Celebrate Cuban.

== Professional career ==
=== Television ===
Lindgren was featured in Keith Famie's Adventures: Miami and South Beach on the Food Network in 2002 and in Tyler's Ultimate: The Ultimate Paella on the Food Network in 2003. He also appeared in Christmas in America: Miami Noche Buena on the Food Network, which originally aired December 14, 2003. Lindgren also appeared on CBS Sunday Morning in 2005 and was featured in a Public television documentary, La Cocina Cubana: Secretos de Mi Abuela -- The Cuban Kitchen: My Grandmother's Secrets, which aired May 26, 2005.

- Taste of America on the Travel Channel: Cuban Tamales. Original air date: June 21, 2005
- Three Guys From Miami Cook Cuban a cooking show on WPBT Public Television Miami
- Despierta América: Camarones con Arroz Amarillo Original air date: October 7, 2005

=== Radio ===
- The Splendid Table on National Public Radio.
- All Things Considered on National Public Radio.
- Several Appearances on Food & Wine Talk on WDNA Radio Miami

== Personal life ==
Lindgren grew up in Minneapolis and first came to Miami in 1984, where he began his studies in Cuban and Latin cuisine. He died while hiking in Minnesota.

== Books ==
- Three Guys From Miami Cook Cuban, 2004, ISBN 1-58685-433-X
- Three Guys From Miami Celebrate Cuban, 2006, ISBN 1-4236-0063-0
