= Danilo Avilés =

Cuban composer and clarinetist

Danilo Avilés Suárez (born 1948) is a Cuban composer and clarinetist. He has received awards for his music work.

== Studies ==
Suárez was born in 1948 in Holguín, Cuba. He studied clarinet with professors Enrique Pardo, Juan Jorge Junco and Fiodor Ananieski in Havana, Cuba. He also studied composition with renowned Cuban composer and musicologist Argeliers León.Later he studied with José Ardévol and José Loyola at Instituto Superior de Arte (ISA).

== Career ==
Suárez worked as a clarinetist in the Orquesta de Teatro y Danza in Havana. He participated as a composer in numerous concerts organized by the Brigada Hermanos Saiz and other cultural institutions in his country. He also received awards from local Symphonic and Chamber Music competitions and participated as a guest in the Warsaw Autumn Festival as well as the Spring Festival in Berlin, Germany. In 1980, he moved to Madrid, Spain where he taught musical composition and chamber music. Later he settled in the US and continued teaching and composing.

== Music work ==
Suárez has written numerous pieces for soprano and piano, clarinet, string quartet, and brass quintet, as well as music for children, choral works, and incidental music. His works have been performed by renowned artists as Cuban pianist Marianela Santurio and conducted by Cuban composer Flores Chaviano in important events such as I Foro de Música Contemporánea in Mexico. The compositions of Suárez have also been premiered in many other concerts in Russia, Poland, Germany, Hungary, Spain and the United States.

== Compositions ==
A list of relevant works from Danilo Avilés includes:

- Mujer Nueva
- Dibujos
- Esa sangre en las calles de Santiago for soprano and orchestral group
- Siento un bombo mamita for symphony orchestra
- Three small poems for voice and piano
- Variations for string orchestra.
- Largas y cortas for Bass Clarinet and Marimba
- Quasi Danzón for Clarinet and piano. Also arranged as a Trombone feature for Wind Ensemble.

== See also ==
Music of Cuba
