= Ignacio Jose Urrutia =

Cuban historian

Ignacio Jose Urrutia was a Cuban historian. He was born in 1730, died 1795. His most famous work, Teatro historico, juridico y politico-militar de la isla Fernandina de Cuba, was published in 1789.
