= Gustavo Arcos =

- Born: December 19, 1926; Caibarién, Cuba
- Died: August 8, 2006 (aged 79); Havana, Cuba

Gustavo Arcos Bergnes (December 19, 1926, in Caibarién, Cuba – August 8, 2006, in Havana, Cuba) was a fellow Cuban revolutionary alongside Fidel Castro who later became an imprisoned dissident of the government. Arcos has been described as "a symbol of the opposition, and the dean of the opposition".

== Biography ==
Born in the small town of Caibarién, Arcos met Castro while the two attended law school at the University of Havana. He participated in the 1953 attack on Moncada Barracks that jump-started the Cuban Revolution against then-leader Fulgencio Batista, where he suffered a gunshot wound to the back that partially disabled his right leg and left him a legacy of lifelong pain.

Freed under a pardon, Arcos spent the next several years gathering support, money, and munitions throughout Mexico, South America, and the United States. Following the success of the revolution in 1959, Arcos became Cuba's ambassador to Belgium. However, while Arcos was away, he grew disillusioned both by Cuba's alliance with the Soviet Union, and what he saw to be the dictatorial tendencies of Fidel Castro.

Upon his return, he began expressing dissent against Castro and the Cuban government. In response, he was arrested and sentenced to 10 years as a counterrevolutionary. He was released after a long hunger strike in 1969, but his request to leave the country was refused.

An attempt to leave the country put Arcos in jail again in 1981. He was released in 1988, and quickly became the executive secretary of the Cuban Committee for Human Rights, which he had joined in the early 1980s. His brother, Sebastian Arcos Bergnes was appointed vice-President of the Committee and was responsible for expanding it from a small Havana-based group into a nationwide organization. Gustavo decided not to leave Cuba and spent the rest of his life trying to improve human rights on the island and promoting a peaceful transition to democracy, stoically suffering repeated harassment, arrests, and "acts of repudiation".

Arcos died on August 8, 2006, after an illness. He was 79. In a number of respects his life story resembles that of Mario Chanes de Armas, another Moncada veteran.
