= Jorge Payret =

Cuban politician (born c. 1939)

Jorge Dideiro Payret Zubiaur (born c. 1939) is a Cuban Communist politician, diplomat and professor in political science at the University of Havana.

Payret has worked for the Cuban foreign department since 1968 and has been Cuba's ambassador to Sweden from 2002 to 2006. He has been Cuba's ambassador to the Federation of St. Kitts and Nevis since 2009. He speaks Spanish, English and Swedish.
