= Lydia Díaz Cruz =

Lydia Diaz Cruz as "The Dying Swan"

Lydia Diaz Cruz was a Prima Ballerina who started dancing in Havana, Cuba, and trained with Fernando Alonso and Alicia Alonso. As a young dancer, she was talent-spotted by a well-known British dancer and teacher from an earlier era, Dame Phyllis Bedells, who traveled to Cuba and regarded her as the most naturally gifted dancer she had seen since Margot Fonteyn. Early marriage and exile from Cuba in the wake of the Castro revolution put a halt to her career, which she resumed after the birth of her third child in the early 1960s. She went on to dance in the United States with Ballet Concerto in Miami, became principal dancer with the National Ballet of Washington, D.C., and performed in principal guest roles with the National Ballet of Venezuela, Washington Ballet, Ballet Spectacular. She danced alongside many of the great artists of the day, including Margot Fonteyn and Melissa Hayden, among many others.

She is probably best known for her role in The Dying Swan, a version that is closer to that of Maya Plisetskaya than the famous early one by Anna Pavlova; many who saw it proclaimed it even more memorable than those of her illustrious predecessors. It was her signature performance, and she danced the piece to the end of her career with undiminished skill and fulsome acclaim from audiences. She was partnered by many of the greatest male dancers of the 20th century, including Fernando Bujones, Peter Martins, Jacques d'Amboise, Edward Villella, Ivan Nagy, and Royes Fernandez. In 1991, she was honored in the United States Congressional Record and by Miami City Ballet, of which she was a founding board member. She died on January 27, 2025, in Miami, Florida.
