= Víctor Ivo Acuña Velázquez =

Cuban military officer (1966–2007)

Víctor Ivo Acuña Velázquez (1966–2007) was a Cuban Communist and lieutenant colonel in the Revolutionary Armed Forces. In 1983 Acuña Velázquez enrolled in the General Carlos Rolof Military Academy, from which he graduated as a communications engineer. In his military career, he occupied various posts linked to the specialty of communications, and he rose successively in rank until attaining that of lieutenant colonel. Acuña Velázquez was murdered in 2007 when he tried to stop two hijackers of an airplane at José Martí International Airport. He was then awarded the Antonio Maceo Medal of Valor posthumously by Raúl Castro.
