= David Masnata y de Quesada =

- Born: September 11, 1926
- Died: October 5, 1988 (aged 62); New York
- Occupations: Genealogist, lawyer, historian
- Parent(s): Emilio Masnata y Azcue; Aurora de Quesada y Miranda
- Relatives: Gonzalo de Quesada; Dr. Ramón L. Miranda

David Masnata y de Quesada, Marquis of Santa Ana y Santa María, was a Cuban lawyer, professor, historian, and founder of the Instituto Cubano de Genealogía y Heráldica.

== Biography ==
Masnata was born on September 11, 1926. He was the first child of Emilio Masnata y Azcue and Aurora de Quesada y Miranda, grandson of Gonzalo de Quesada, an associate of Cuban revolutionary hero José Martí, and great-grandson of Dr. Ramón L. Miranda, the family physician of José Martí.

Masnata's interest in genealogy and history developed during his early years. He founded the Instituto Cubano de Genealogía y Heráldica (Cuban Institute of Genealogy and Heraldry) in 1950 and served as secretary until 1961. He was also a member of the Sociedad Cubana de Estudios Históricos y Internacionales (Cuban Society of Historical and International Studies) from 1956 to 1961 and was an honorary member of the Academia Mejicana de Genealogía y Heráldica (Mexican Academy of Genealogy and Heraldry) from 1950 to 1988.

Following Castro's communist takeover of Cuba, Masnata moved to New York in 1961 and left behind a large collection of Cuban books and research papers on Cuban and Spanish history, genealogy, and heraldry. While in exile, Masnata compiled a new collection of approximately three thousand books and thousands of records and documents on Spanish and Cuban genealogy. He became a proficient genealogist, and traced his ancestors from the sixteenth century to the early twentieth century.

At the age of twenty-five, Masnata received his law degree from the University of Havana and practiced law in Cuba until 1961. From 1951 to 1961 he was a member of the Colegio de Abogados de la Habana (Bar Association of Havana). He received another degree from New York University in 1967 and entered the Bar Association of New York City in 1969. From 1970 to 1971 Masnata served as a professor at Columbia University. Masnata was acknowledged by the Supreme Court of the United States in 1973 and licensed to practice in Washington, DC, and New York. In 1979, Masnata was licensed to practice law in Spain and became a member of the Ilustre Colegio de Abogados de Madrid.

He received the Prix de Liechtenstein in 1985 from H.R.H. Frank Josef II, Reigning Prince of Liechtenstein, for his work La Casa Real de la Cerda (The Royal House of La Cerda).

David Masnata died in New York on October 5, 1988.

== Works or publications ==
- El movimiento scout mundial. México, D.F.: Editorial Scout Interamericana. 1963. OCLC 20977955.
- Juicio crítico de Martí, orador. Havana: Asociación Universitaria José Martí. 1948. OCLC 288610444.
- La identidad de Vasco Porcallo de Mendoza, conquistador de Cuba, de México y de Guatemala. Trujillo: Real Academia de Extremadura de las Letras y las Artes. 1992. OCLC 872628242.
- Precisiones y nuevos datos sobre el entorno familiar de Alfonso X el Sabio, fundador de Ciudad Real. OCLC 872581090.
- Su majestad princesa Sofía de Grecia, reina de España : (costados y ascendencia española). Madrid: [publisher not identified]. 1978. OCLC 7672537.
- Su majestad Princesa Sofia de Grecia, Reina de España: costados y ascendencia españda/por David E. Masnata y de Quesada. Madrid: D. E. Masnata. 1978. OCLC 83475781.
- Tabla Foto Genealogica. Coral Gables, Fla. 1976. OCLC 80726499.
- Tabla Genealogica Monstrando El Parentesco De David Masnata Y De Quesada Con Sus Majestades Juan-Carlos I Y Doña Sofia, Reyes De España. Coral Gables, Fla. 1976. OCLC 79680664.
- Tabla Genealogica Monstrando El Parentesco De Jorge Washington, 1er Presidente De Los Estados Unidos De America Con Sus Majestades Juan-Carlos I Y Doña Sofia, Reyes De España. Coral Gables, Fla. 1976. OCLC 81399626.
- The International Scout Movement : Official Motion Submitted for Consideration to the International Conference of Lisbon, Portugal, Under Article IX of the Constitution and Bye-laws by Dr. David Masnata De Quesada, Assistant International Commissioner. Havana: Asociacion de Scouts de Cuba. 1960. OCLC 2817605.
- Tributación de la industria azucarera. Habana: Editorial Lex. 1953. OCLC 9792114.
