= Pedro Pablo Prada Quintero =

Cuban diplomat

Pedro Pablo Prada Quintero is a Cuban diplomat.

He is the first Cuban ambassador since the 1960s to El Salvador. Prior to that appointment he was the deputy director of the Bureau for Latin America and the Caribbean of the Ministry of Foreign Affairs of Cuba.

Prada Quintero has worked in Granma, Cuba's official newspaper. He served as advisor to the Cuban Foreign Ministry (1994–1999). He also worked at the Information Office of that ministry.

He has also served as charge d'affaires of Cuba in Denmark and has been a member of the Cuban delegations to the United Nations.
