= Raúl Musibay =

Cuban chef

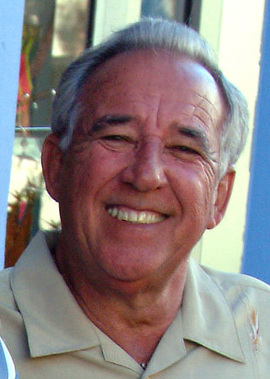
Raúl Musibay, 2004

Raúl Musibay (born in Cayo la Rosa, near Bauta in the province of Havana, Cuba) is a chef and Internet entrepreneur.

Musibay is a member of the Three Guys From Miami and is known for his elaborate Cuban-style pigroasts and has taught this art worldwide to hundreds of people. With his two brothers-in-law, he runs the Cuban website, The Internet Cuban. The three chefs and authors have made several appearances on the cable television channel Food Network. The Three Guys From Miami are authors of the books "Three Guys From Miami Cook Cuban" ISBN 1-58685-433-X, and "Three Guys From Miami Celebrate Cuban" ISBN 1-4236-0063-0.
