= Saturnino Lora =

Cuban revolutionaries

Saturnino Lora Torres (1858-1921) was a Cuban revolutionary and brother of Mariano Lora.

== Overview ==
The War of Independence of Cuba started on 24 February 1895, under the intellectual leadership of the writer and philosopher José Martí, often called Father of the Country in Cuba. Martí gave the order to start the Revolution on that date, which started simultaneously in four places—in Bayate, under Bartolomé Masó; in Ibarra, under Juan Gualberto Gómez and Antonio López Coloma; in Baire, with the brothers Saturnino and Mariano Lora and their uncle Mariano Torres Mora; and in Guantánamo, with Periquito Pérez, Emilio Giró and others. 24 February is commemorated in Cuba as a national holiday under the name "Grito de Baire" ("Shout of Baire"). Saturnino Lora Civil Hospital is named after Saturnino.
