= Juan Valdez (footballer) =

Aruban footballer (born 1983)

Personal information
- Date of birth: November 24, 1983 (age 42)
- Position: Defender

Team information
- Current team: SV Britannia Piedra Plat

International career
Years	Team	Apps	(Gls)
2004–2011	Aruba	3	(0)

Juan Valdez (born November 24, 1983) is an Aruban football player. He has played for Aruba national team.

== National team statistics ==
Aruba national team
Year	Apps	Goals
2004	2	0
2011	1	0
Total	3	0
