= National Ballet Theater of Puerto Rico =

Ballet company in Puerto Rico

The National Ballet Theater of Puerto Rico (Spanish: Balleteatro Nacional de Puerto Rico) is one of the leading ballet companies in Puerto Rico.

It was formed by former members of Ballet Concierto de Puerto Rico after the company was paralyzed by a dancers' strike in 2004. They performed for the first time in April 2005 at the Francisco Arriví Theater in San Juan under the direction of Miguel Campaneria.

The company is located in the city of Guaynabo.

== Company ==
As of May 2010:

=== Principal dancers ===
- José Rodríguez
- Laura Valentín

=== Soloists ===
- Lara Berríos
- Odemar Ocasio

=== Corps de ballet ===
- Miguel Cáez
- Francesca García
- Saori Kawasaki
- Luis Martínez
- Elmer Pérez
- Daniel Ramírez
- Tatiana Rodríguez
- Omar Román
- Carolina Wolf
