= Idania Martínez Grandales =

Cuban broadcaster, journalist and academic

Idania Martínez
- Born: Martínez Grandales, Idania; February 6, 1965; Havana, Cuba
- Occupation(s): Television presenter Radio broadcaster Journalist; Professor
- Years active: 1991–

Idania Martínez Grandales (born in Havana on 6 February 1965) is a Cuban broadcaster, journalist and academic, and professor of voice-over at the Faculty of Communication of the University of Havana.

== Biography ==
In June 1988, Martínez Grandales graduated with a gold degree in education, specializing in Spanish literature, from Enrique José Varona University of Pedagogical Sciences. She enrolled in a course for training of speakers and was taught by Nelson Moreno de Ayala (1930-2014) and Orestes Martel (1949-).

As an undergraduate, she was placed in the rural municipality of Melena del Sur, Cuba, where she completed three years of Social Service. When she finished, she started working at Radio Cadena Habana on a program called La hora del estudiante (The Student’s Hour).

=== Career in radio ===
Martínez Grandales has worked as a broadcaster since 1991. She began her career on Radio Cadena Habana with the programme "La hora del estudiante." Subsequently, she worked as a live voice-over artist. From October 9, 1995 to December 31, 2005, she was the main announcer of Radio Reloj, where she hosted the news magazine "Impactos" on Radio Coco, the provincial news programme "En síntesis" on Radio Cadena Habana, the news programme "De buena tinta" on Radio Metropolitana and the news magazine "Despertar con Cuba" on Radio Habana Cuba. She also hosted the news magazine "Habana 19".

At Radio Rebelde, Martínez Grandales hosted the national radio news programme "Noticiero Nacional de Radio", the programme "Estaciones, Portada Rebelde," and since 2010 she has been the host of the news magazine "Haciendo radio."

=== Career in television ===
Martínez Grandales has made frequent voice-over recordings for the Publicimer company and for the film section of the Cuban Revolutionary Armed Forces. She has also worked as a narrator in television dubbing. She has voiced television commercials, documentaries and comedy shows.

=== Awards and distinctions ===
- 2012 (22 August): 90th Anniversary Seal of Cuban Radio.
- 2015: Popularity Award for the programme Entre tú y yo.
- 2015: Enrique Almirante Award
- 2015: Award in Poetry at the Tenth National Festival of Young Creators of Radio Antonio Lloga in Memoriam.
- 2016: Popularity Award for the programme Entre tú y yo.
- 2016: 65th Anniversary Seal of Cuban Television.
- 2016: Caricato Award, from the UNEAC (Union of Writers and Artists of Cuba).
- 2017 (22 August): 90th Anniversary Stamp of Cuban Radio
- 2017: Popularity Award for the programme Entre tú y yo.
- 2018: Doctor honoris causaof the Florida Global University (in Mexico City).
- 2018: Best Screenplay Award at the Antonio Lloga In Memoriam Festival (Havana).
- 2019: Doctor honoris causa of the Universidad Inteligente de México (in Toluca de Lerdo).
- Raúl Gómez García Medal
- 2019: Prize in the Literary Competition of the Francisco Manzano Poetry Biennial (Regla).

In 2019 she was a delegate to the 9th Congress of the UNEAC (Union of Writers and Artists of Cuba), held at the Palacio de las Convenciones in Havana.

She was also a member of the jury for the 2019 UNEAC Caracol Prize.

- Member of the UNEAC (Union of Writers and Artists of Cuba).
- Member of the Agency of Artistic Representations Caricatos.
- Member of the Cátedra Nacional de Locución de Cuba (National Speech Chair of Cuba).
- Member of the National Evaluation Tribunal of Cuban Radio Broadcasters.
