= Mario Ernesto Sánchez =

Cuban actor (1947–2025)

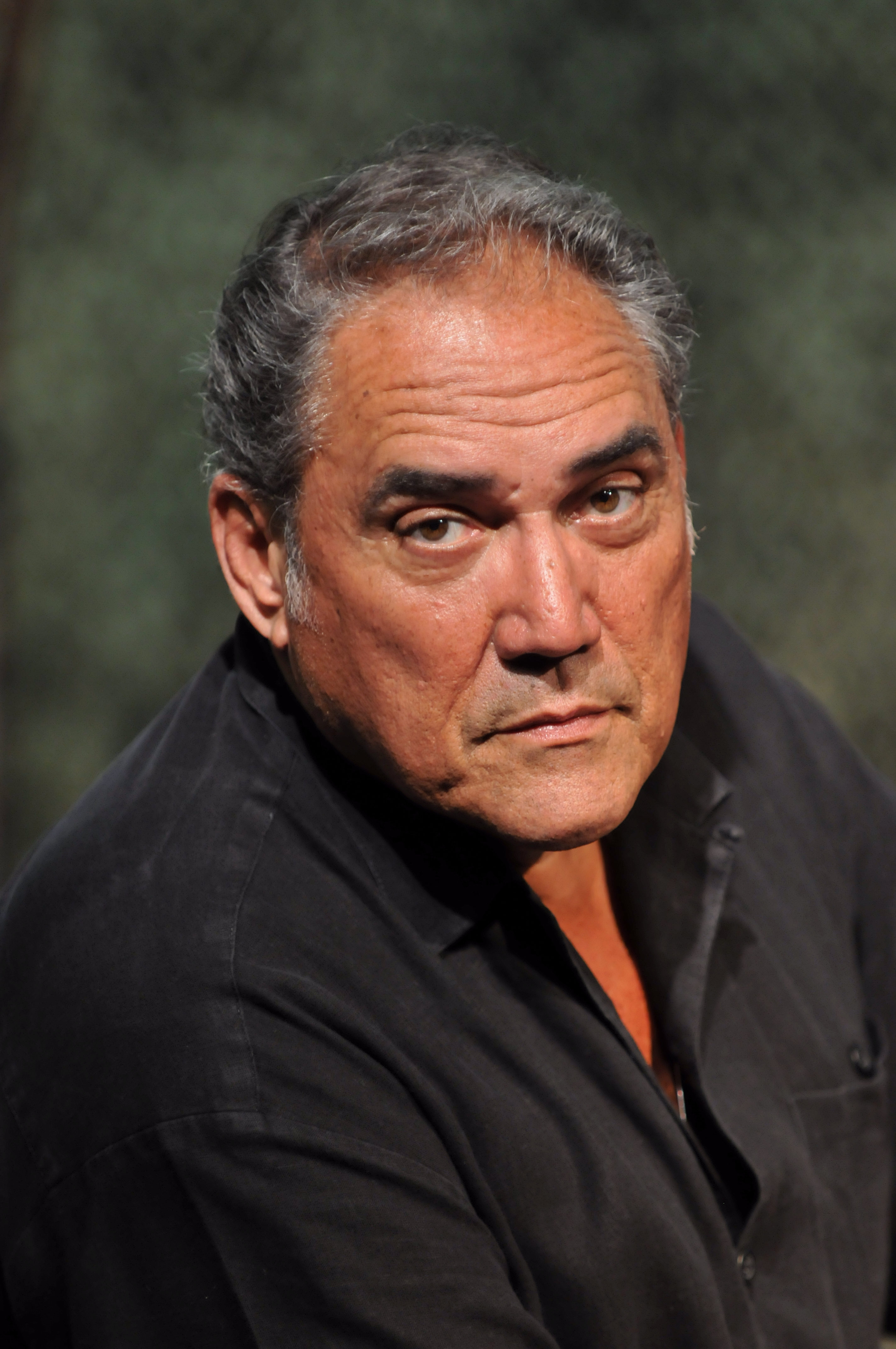
- Sánchez in 2011
- Born: 10 January 1947; San Antonio de las Vegas, Cuba
- Died: 10 April 2025 (aged 78); Miami, Florida, U.S.
- Occupation: Actor
- Years active: 1980–2022

Mario Ernesto Sánchez (10 January 1947 – 10 April 2025) was a Cuban actor who founded Teatro Avante, a Hispanic theatre, in 1979 in Florida. He also founded the International Hispanic Theatre Festival of Miami. He played various bit parts on Miami Vice and in Hollywood movies, including Invasion U.S.A. (1985) The Specialist (1994), Proof of Life (2000).

Sánchez was born in San Antonio de las Vegas, in Cuba. He went to the United States as a teenager, at 15, during the Operation Pedro Pan. Among his various roles, he appeared in 5 episodes of Miami Vice (as a limo driver), the film Miami Vice (2006) (as a different character), the film Bad Boys as a drug buyer, the film The Truman Show as a security guard and the classic British sitcom Only Fools and Horses as a Colombian drug baron.

Sánchez died in Miami on 10 April 2025, at the age of 78.
