= Miguel Campaneria =

Cuban ballet dancer and choreographer

Miguel Campaneria is a Cuban ballet dancer and choreographer.

== Life ==
He started his ballet training at the National Ballet Academy of Cuba under Alicia Alonso and Azari Plisetski. He joined the National Ballet of Cuba where he became a soloist. Later on, he won the bronze medal in the junior category at the International Ballet Competition in Varna, Bulgaria. He has danced with American Ballet Theatre, Pennsylvania Ballet, Les Grands Ballets Canadiens, and was a principal dancer with the Pittsburgh Ballet Theater and Ballets de San Juan. In the 1990s he started teaching and served as ballet master of Ballet Concierto de Puerto Rico. In 2004 he became the artistic director of the National Ballet Theater of Puerto Rico in San Juan, Puerto Rico.

In the summer of 1983, Mr. Campaneria accompanied fellow Ballets de San Juan principal, Maria Teresa del Real, to the International Ballet Competition in Varna, Bulgaria. Participating in the Competition as a non-competitor, Mr. Campaneria was awarded the special prize as Best Partner, and his experience proved beneficial in Miss del Real being awarded the bronze medal in the senior category at the Competition. Their performance in the Don Quixote Pas de Deux was lauded as the single most impressive event at the Competition. Both Mr. Campaneria and Miss del Real were invited to the White House by President Reagan to receive his personal congratulations on their achievements in Varna.

In 2007, Mr. Campaneria was appointed to the National Council on the Arts (2007–2012) by the President George Bush and approved by the Senate. The Council advises the Chairman of the National Endowment for the Arts on applications for Federal grant funds for the arts recommended by its advisory panels, leadership initiatives, agency funding priorities, and policies involving the Congress of the United States and other issues of importance to the arts at the national level. The appointment is recognition of his widely recognized expertise, eminence, and profound interest in the Arts.

He was Chair of the Community Division Dance Department for the University of Hartford.

Since 2010, Mr. Campaneria has been an Artistic Director and Ballet Master coaching pre-professional students and professional dancers in the state of North Carolina. His studio, Campaneria Ballet School, is located in Cary, NC. He currently has over twenty former students who are working in professional companies all around the world. Under his professional coaching, numerous students have competed in many world competitions and won top places in both Classical and Contemporary Ballet categories. In addition, he has been awarded “The Outstanding Teacher Award” by Youth America Grand Prix in 2012 and 2013. Most recently, in 2014, Campaneria provided the opportunity and selected top students to perform abroad dancing leading roles, which provided not only invaluable dance experience and exposure to the students but tremendous personal cultural enrichment. His multinational relationships in the ballet community are strong, ongoing, and ever-growing.

As of August, 2015, Mr. Campaneria is teaching in his school Campaneria Ballet School in Cary, NC, USA.
