= Héctor Zumbado =

Cuban writer (1932–2016)

- Born: Héctor Zumbado Argueta; 19 March 1932; Vedado, Havana, Cuba
- Died: 6 June 2016 (aged 84); Havana, Cuba
- Occupations: Journalist, writer
- Spouse: Mabel Zumbado
- Children: 4
- Writing career
- Pen name: H. Zumbado
- Language: Spanish
- Years active: 1963-1990
- Genre: Humor
- Subjects: Cuban culture and social customs
- Notable works: Limonada (1979); Riflexiones (1980) ¡Esto le zumba! (1981)
- Notable awards: Cuban National Humor Award (2000); National Culture Distinción; Raúl Gómez García Medal

Héctor Zumbado Argueta (19 March 1932, Havana – 6 June 2016, Havana), also known as H. Zumbado, was a Cuban writer, journalist, critic, humorist, satirist, and essayist. He was widely considered one of the foremost Cuban humorists and satirists of his time, earning him the labels of "godfather" of Cuban humorists and "Saint Zumbado". He worked for publications including Bohemia and Juventud Rebelde and published at least nine books, many of them collections or anthologies of short stories, articles, or essays. These included Limonada (1978), ¡Esto le zumba! (1981), and Kitsch, Kitsch, ¡BANG, BANG! (1988). In 2000, Cuba's Humor Promotion Center chose him to receive the inaugural National Humor Award.

== Biography ==
Héctor Zumbado was born in Vedado, Havana on 19 March 1932 to a Nicaraguan mother and a Costa Rican father. His parents met in Madrid and married in New York City before locating for work to Havana in the 1930s. Zumbado studied at the Baldor School in Vedado until the end of his second year of high school, then moved to the United States in 1948 and finished his secondary education there in 1950.

In 1950, he moved to Venezuela and worked as a translator for two years. In 1953, he worked as an auditor for an electric company in Port-au-Prince, Haiti, despite only fulfilling one of the requirements: "they were looking for a young person who could speak French and knew about accounting... the one thing I had to fulfill the requirements was my youth, since I had no knowledge of French or accounting." According to his book Prosas en ajiaco (1984), he variously worked as a money collector for a navigation company, a salesman, a trainee bullfighter, a product mixer at a deodorant factory, and a secretary at an insurance company. In the 1950s, he attended University of Havana for two years to study journalism but did not complete his degree. During that time, he was involved with the Directorio Revolucionario. Between 1956 and 1961, Zumbado worked in advertising for tourism agencies before being appointed head of advertising and market research at the National Institute of the Tourism Industry in 1961. In 1963, he joined the Ministry of Food Industry.

Starting in 1963, he began publishing stories in Bohemia and Juventud Rebelde, and was invited to join Juventud Rebelde's humor publication, La Chicharra, in 1968. One of his best-known columns for Juventud Rebelde was Limonada, which appeared in the Sunday newspapers between 1969 and 1970. About 40 articles were published in regular circulation and humorously explored the "deficiencies in temperament, character, and personality", as well as the "positive facets", of what he referred to as "Cuban idiosyncrasy" borne from the colonization of the Americas. A selection of 38 stories were compiled into a book in 1979. Another popular Sunday column was Riflexiones, a series focused on "attitudes, methods, and situations" in a more general sense, as opposed to the personal traits discussed in Limonada. The name is a portmanteau of rifle and reflexión ("reflection"), meant to "[combine] thinking, reflecting, [...] focusing and aiming". It was published as a book in 1980. Both columns looked at Cuba's "problems of transport, gastronomy and other services, and [...] the sloppiness, laziness and bureaucracy of administrators and average officials" in a humorous light.

Following his time at Juventud Rebelde, Zumbado became deputy head of Prensa Latina's North Zone, which covered the United States and Canada. He wrote the column El american way, an international column that satirized the American way of life. He was editor-in-chief of the magazine Cuba between 1971 and 1973, and later for UNEAC's publication La hiena triste. He then worked for the Institute of the Domestic Demand as an exportable funds publicity and promotion adviser. Around this time, his book ¡Esto le zumba!, a collection of 25 short stories, was published in 1981. The stories had been written over the last 20 years, from February 1963 to March 1981. Like Limonada, ¡Esto le zumba! is a humorous commentary on Cuban social customs. Between 1986 and 1988, Zumbado was head of Bohemia's humor page, La Bobería, which he had created. In 1987, he collaborated with Radio Rebelde, and in 1988 became editor-in-chief of the Cuban tourism magazine Sol y Son.

Zumbado was given the inaugural National Humor Award from Cuba's Humor Promotion Center in 2000. His other awards included the National Union of Cultural Workers' Raúl Gómez García Medal and a distinction for National Culture. During his career, he also wrote for La Gaceta de Cuba, Revolución y Cultura, and Opina, and was a judge in Union of Journalists of Cuba literary humor competitions. His writings appeared internationally in publications based in Chile, Uruguay, Dominican Republic, Algeria, India, Norway, and the German Democratic Republic, among other countries. Zumbado sustained a head injury in February 1990, leaving him struggling to speak and write, and he effectively vanished from public view.

In 2012, Editorial Letras Cubanas published ¡Aquí está Zumbado!, an anthology of Zumbado's stories. El tipo que creía en el sol, a collection of 16 stories, was published by Miami-based publisher La Pereza Ediciones in 2019, three years after Zumbado's death. This was the first of his books, rather than just his articles, to be published outside of Cuba. It was released in a limited batch of 500 copies.

== Personal life ==
In February 1990, Zumbado received a severe blow to the head on a public street from an unknown source. His injuries were severe enough that he lost the ability to speak and write without difficulty, effectively forcing him into retirement.

Zumbado and his wife Mabel had two sons and two daughters: Héctor, Karla, Yamil, and Teriana. He was fluent in English, French, and German, in addition to his native Spanish. He died in Havana, Cuba on 6 June 2016.

== Bibliography ==
- ¡Compañía atención!. 1976.
- Limonada. Editorial Letras Cubanas. 1979.
- Amor a primer añejo. Editorial Letras Cubanas. 1980.
- Riflexiones. Unión. 1980.
- El american way. Orbe. 1981.
- ¡Esto le zumba!. Editorial Letras Cubanas. 1981.
- Prosas en ajiaco. Havana, Cuba: Editorial Letras Cubanas. 1984.
- Nuevas riflexiones. Editorial Letras Cubanas. 1985.
- Kitsch, kitsch, ¡BANG, BANG!. Editorial Letras Cubanas. 1988.
- Perfume y olor. 1998.
