= Luisa Martínez Casado =

Cuban actress

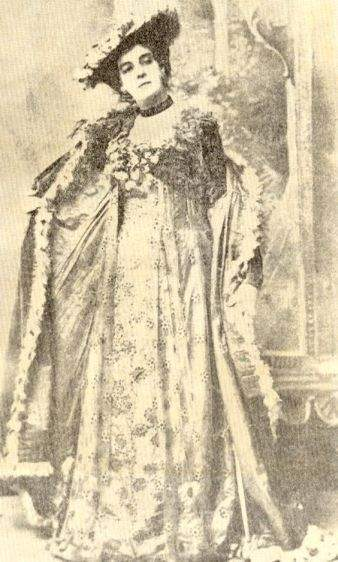
- Born: 1860; Cienfuegos, Captaincy General of Cuba, Spanish Empire
- Died: 1925 (aged 64–65); Cienfuegos, Cuba
- Occupation: Actress

Luisa Martínez Casado Muñoz (1860-1925) was a Cuban actress who performed in Spain and throughout Latin-America, enjoying particular success in her native Cuba and in Mexico. Winning no less than 47 gold medals, she has been described as the most successful Spanish-speaking actress of the 19th century, on a par with Eleonora Duse and Sarah Bernhardt.

== Biography ==
Born on 28 August 1860 in Cienfuegos, Luisa Martínez Casado Muñoz was the daughter of the writer, theatre and newspaper owner, Luis Martínez Casado, and his wife Guadalupe Muñoz. She had three elder sisters and two younger brothers. Thanks to her father, when she was only six years old, she appeared on the stage reciting La vaquera de la Finojosa. In 1868, the family moved to Havana where Martínez Casado appeared in El gorrión, a play written by her father.

As she grew older, she appeared in an ever-wider variety of plays, together with established actors including Ceferino Guerra, Julio G. Segarra, Ana Suárez Peraza and Eloísa Agüero. It is believed Enrique Zumel's Laura (1864) was written specially for her. In 1876 she performed in Mexico where she was reported to have been "inimitable". On her return to Cuba in July 1877, still just 17, she played Dorotea in Pancho Fernández' Los negros catedráticos. and appeared in José E. Triay's Cervantes in memory of the author of Don Quijote.

In September 1878, Martínez Casado was admitted to the Madrid Royal Conservatory where she studied under Concepción Sanpelayo, Florencio Romea and Matilde Diez. She was such a talented student that she completed the four-year course of study in just six months, receiving the conservatory's first prize for tragedy, comedy and drama. In December 1878, she performed in Spain in a work written for her by José Echegaray titled Mar sin orillas. She continued to perform to wide acclaim in Madrid and the provinces over the next five years.

When she was 28, she returned to Cuba for a short period, signed a contract with the theatrical empresario Leopoldo Burón, and in 1888 went on to Mexico City where she appeared at the Teatro Arbeu, receiving standing ovations and countless bouquets. President Porfirio Díaz even invited her to the presidential palace while his wife presented her with gifts including a jewelry box with over 30 jewels. After touring the Mexican provinces, she returned to the capital in 1889, appearing this time at the Teatro El Nacional.

== Personal life ==
On 1 January 1891, Martínez Casado married Isaac Puga, an actor she had met in Spain and who had travelled to meet her in Cuba. Together they had four children.

== Theatrical company ==
The same year she returned to Spain, broke off her contract with Burón and created her own theatrical company bearing her name. Over the next 20 years, she performed with her company in Cuba, Mexico, Puerto Rico, Colombia, Santo Domingo, Panama, Costa Rica and Venezuela, earning more than three million pesos, a veritable fortune.

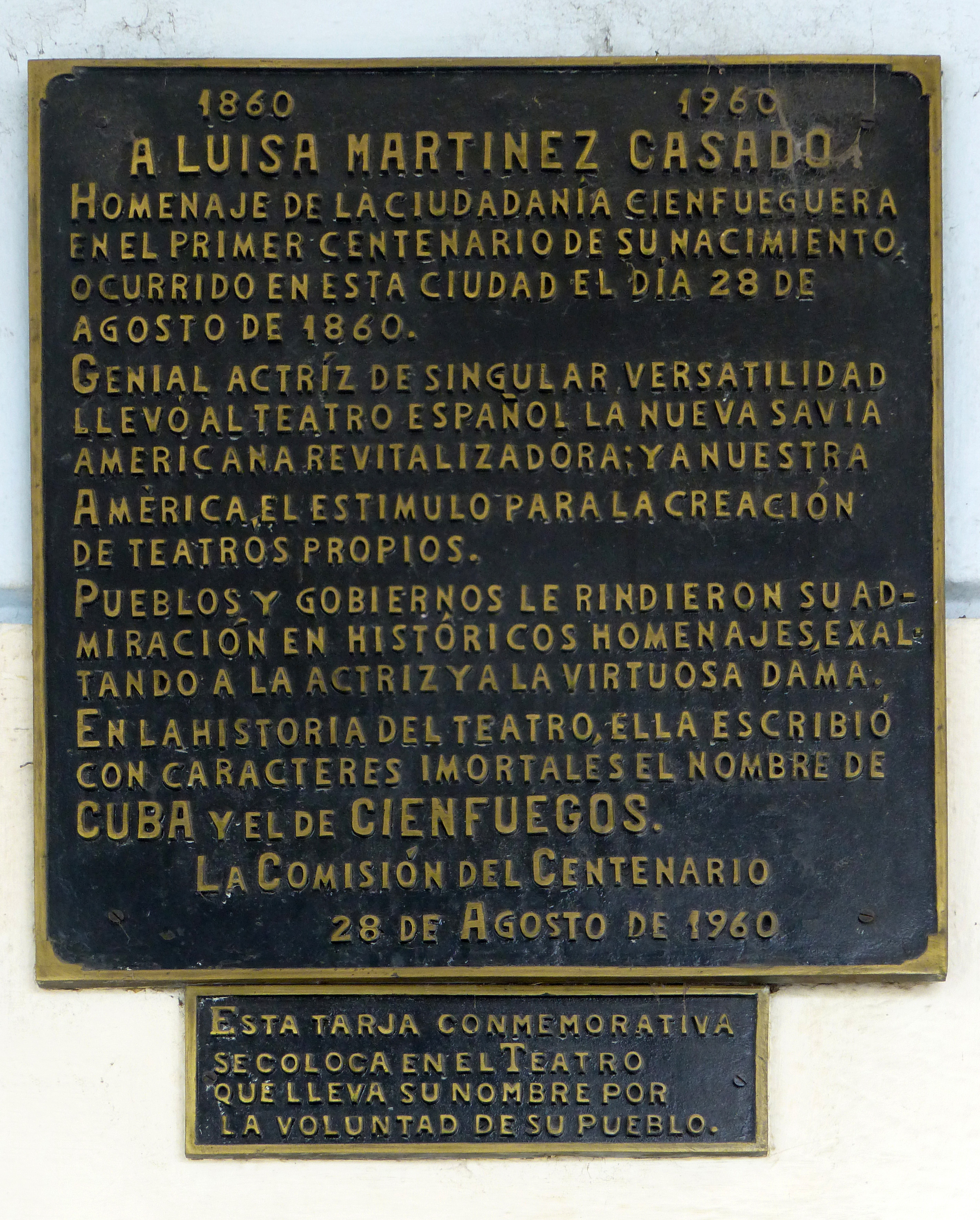
Plaque commemorating her life located in Cienfuegos.

In 1910, now aged 50, Martínez Casado established the Sociedad para el Fomento del Teatro, a foundation aimed at encouraging Cuban authors to write plays and revive past Cuban theatrical works. In 1911, following the death of her husband, Martínez Casado retired from the stage, giving her last performance in Cárdenas where she played in Locura de amor by Manuel Tamayo y Baus.

== Death ==
On 28 September 1925, Luisa Martínez Casado died in her home town of Cienfuegos.
