= Yat-Sen Chang =

Cuban former dancer and convicted rapist

Yat-Sen Chang Oliva (born 1971 in Matanzas, Cuba) is a Cuban former principal dancer and convicted rapist.

== Biography ==
Yat-Sen Chang is a Chinese Cuban born in Matanzas, Cuba. Yat-Sen Chang studied dance at the Cuban National Ballet School, beginning his studies at the age of nine. In 1989 he graduated as a dancer and teacher and joined the Cuban National Ballet under Alicia Alonso.

In 1992, he was invited to the International Dance Festival of La Baule and joined Jeune Ballet de France, in the same year and performed in many different countries. He joined the English National Ballet in 1993 as principal dancer.

He has a daughter with fellow ENB former principal dancer and ex-girlfriend Simone Clarke.

Yat-Sen studied at the Cuban National Ballet School, beginning his studies at the age of nine. The youngest of three brothers (all professionally trained ballet dancers), he graduated as a dancer and teacher in 1989 and immediately joined the Cuban National Ballet Company.

Yat-Sen performed both nationally and internationally as a guest artist in many Galas, including; A Homage to Nureyev at The Coliseum Theatre, The 50th Birthday Wings in memory of Diana, Princess of Wales, The 50th Anniversary of The English National Ballet, Dame Beryl Grey's Evening at Sadler's Wells Theatre and The 10th Anniversary of Danzaria. Yat-Sen was also a guest artist with the Northern Ballet Theatre NBT in the production The Three Musketeers. He also appeared on television as the lead dancer in Granada Television's Men in Tights and on Blue Peter performing The Twins from William Tuckett's Canterville Ghost.

Awards he received included Best Partner at the Varna International Festival (1990) and The "Leonida Massine Award" in Positano for Best Classical Dancer (1999). Yat-Sen is also the Guinness World Record holder of the fastest turns within 30 seconds.

Yat-Sen Chang became the Artistic Director of the Espinosa Dance Project in February 2012. In addition to the EDP company class, He also gave private tuition to vocationally trained students and professionals.

In August 2013 he started his own brand new company, Yat-Sen Chang Dance Company.

== Sexual assault allegations and charges ==
Chang was accused of sexually assaulting three women at a London dance school. He was charged with 14 counts of sexual assault on a girl between 2014 and 2016. She was as young as 16 when these incidents occurred. He denied these charges in the Magistrates Court, but on 11 May 2021 was found guilty of 12 counts of sexual assault and one count of assault by penetration. He was sentenced to 9 years in prison.

== See also ==
- List of Cubans
