= Conchita Espinosa =

World-renowned pianist

Conchita Espinosa (February 23, 1914 – September 19, 2006) was a world-renowned pianist who combined academics and the arts to create an educational style that exists today at Conchita Espinosa Academy in Miami, Florida.

== Early life and education ==
When Espinosa was three years old, she played popular Cuban melodies on the piano by ear for the first time in an ice cream parlor. She began formal piano lessons when she was five. At the age of 14, Espinosa graduated from the Conservatorio Internacional de Música in Havana as a professor of piano and music theory. She continued her music education with renowned professors and artists Joaquín Nin, Ernesto Berumen and Jascha Fishermann. Espinosa performed concerts in Mexico, Cuba and the United States

== Career ==
In 1933, at the age of 19, she founded “La Academia Musical Conchita Espinosa” in Havana. By 1959, at the end of Batista's pro-Western rule, the Academy – which included an elementary school and music and dance programs – had 450 students. Three decades later, after leaving Fidel Castro's Cuba and arriving in Miami, Espinosa continued her life's work as a teacher of music.

In 1963, she opened Conchita Espinosa Academy in Miami, in the garage of a small home in the neighborhood that would later become Little Havana. The Academy grew in enrollment, until, in 1984, it moved to a 10-acre (40,000 m^{2}) parcel. The school now serves students in grades pre-kindergarten to eighth grade. Conchita Espinosa Academy is now directed by her daughter, Maribel Diaz.

== Awards ==
During her extensive career, Espinosa received many honors including the Richard and Dorothy Lear Memorial “Distinguished Educator Award” (March 1994) and the “Legacy of Excellence Award” presented by General Motors during the 1999 Miami Hispanic Heritage Festival. Additionally, she received “Conchita Espinosa Day” proclamations from both the City of Miami and Miami-Dade County. In 2001, SW 6th street – which fronts Conchita Espinosa Academy – was named “Conchita Espinosa Way.” The last honor presented to Espinosa before her death was the prestigious Medalla de Excelencia Nacional Cubana from the Instituto de San Carlos de Cayo Hueso in May 2006.
