= Sebastian Arcos Bergnes =

Cuban human rights activist

- Born: 1931
- Died: December 22, 1997 (aged 65–66); New York City
- Occupation: Dentist
- Organization: Committee for Human Rights in Cuba
- Known for: human rights activism
- Relatives: Gustavo Arcos and Luis Arcos Bergnes (brothers)

Sebastian Arcos Bergnes (1931 – December 22, 1997, New York City) was a Cuban human rights activist. A prominent Cuban dissident, he was openly adversarial to the dictatorships of Fidel Castro and Fulgencio Batista.

== Role in Cuban Revolution ==
Arcos's family had a long history of political action. His older brother Gustavo was maimed fighting alongside Castro at the Moncada Barracks, the first battle of the Cuban Revolution. Another brother, Luis, was later killed in the fighting. Sebastian, a dentist by training, also opposed that Batista dictatorship.

In the years following the revolution, Arcos held several posts in the Castro government. In the 1960s, however, Gustavo was arrested for criticizing Castro, and Arcos resigned his membership in the Communist Party of Cuba.

== Committee for Human Rights in Cuba ==
In 1981, Arcos helped found the Committee for Human Rights in Cuba, becoming its vice president. His brother Gustavo served as president. The group was one of the first dissident groups in Cuba.

Later in the same year, Arcos was arrested, spending more than six years with Gustavo in Combinado del Este prison.

== 1992 arrest ==
In March 1990, in reaction to the UN Commission of Human Rights having passed a resolution criticizing Cuba's human rights record, the regime launched the worst wave of "acts of repudiation" since the 1980 Mariel Boatlift, starting with Arcos's home, which suffered two attacks in one week. In the second attack, the Arcos home was kept under constant siege for almost two days by an angry government-led mob. In the summer of 1990, the CCPDH once again made history by calling on the Cuban regime to engage in a "civic dialogue" with opponents inside and outside the island. Ironically, as a result, CCPDH members were accused of being "US agents" by the Cuban regime and "Castro agents" by the exiled community.

In 1992, Arcos was again arrested by the secret police. Charged with "enemy propaganda" and "inciting to rebellion," he was sentenced to four years and eight months. He was transferred to Ariza Prison in Cienfuegos Province, more than 130 miles from Havana, where he was imprisoned alongside dangerous criminals and systematically denied medical attention. In 1993 the regime offered Arcos a deal: he would be released immediately if he only agreed to leave the island for good. Arcos rejected the deal, becoming the first political prisoner ever to choose prison in Cuba over freedom in exile.

== Release and illness ==
After an international campaign that included his designation as an Amnesty International prisoner of conscience and a request by France Libertés, the organization founded by former French first lady Danielle Mitterrand, Arcos was released in 1995. A few weeks after his release, Arcos was diagnosed with a malignant tumor in the rectum, for which he had previously been denied medicine and treatment in prison.

After a Cuban doctor was fired from his post for treating Arocs, he traveled to Miami for further care. In 1996 he testified before the UN Human Rights Commission in Geneva, Switzerland, and in 1997 was awarded the first Human Rights Award given by the Spanish-Cuban Foundation (Fundación Hispano-Cubana). Arcos died in the family home in Miami on December 22, 1997. After his death, US President Bill Clinton described him as "a courageous and tireless activist for human rights, democracy and freedom in Cuba", while Cuban human rights activist Elizardo Sanchez Santa Cruz called him "irreplaceable" to the dissident movement.

== Family ==
Arcos had two children, Sebastian and Maria Rosa. He also had a brother named Luis Arcos Bergnes.

== See also ==
- Human Rights in Cuba
