= Juan Valdés Figueroa =

Cuban diplomat

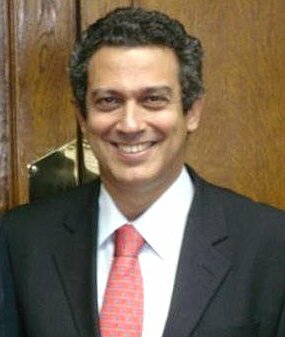
In September 2008

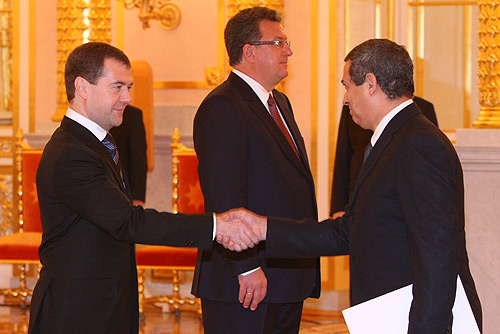
Mr. Juan Valdés Figueroa delivers the Credentials to the Russian President Dimitry Medvedev on January 16, 2009.

Juan Valdés Figueroa is a Cuban diplomat. He was born in Havana city on September 20, 1957. Juan Valdés Figueroa is currently the Extraordinary and Plenipotentiary Ambassador of the Republic of Cuba to the Republic of Belarus (since 2017). On January 16, 2018, he handed the Credentials to the President of the Republic of Belarus, Alexander Lukashenko.

Valdés previously was Ambassador Extraordinary and Plenipotentiary of the Republic of Cuba to the Russian Federation from 2008 to 2012, appointed by the Council of State of Cuba as the Ambassador of Cuba to Russia on 13 August 2008, and presented his Letter of Credence to President of Russia Dmitry Medvedev on 16 January 2009.

He is married to Marta Olga Carreras Rivery. He has two children, Alexei and Juan Enrique.

== See also ==
- Foreign relations of Cuba
- History of Cuba
- Ministry of Foreign Affairs
