= Teatro Avante =

Spanish language theatre in Miami

- Interactive map of Teatro Avante
- Address: 744 S.W. 8th Street, 2nd Floor; Miami, Florida, 33130; United States
- Coordinates: 25.765820°N 80.206619°W

Construction
- Opened: 1979

Teatro Avante is a nonprofit theater organization located in the Little Havana neighborhood of Miami, Florida.

== History ==
Teatro Avante, founded by Mario Ernesto Sánchez in 1978, focuses on preserving Hispanic theater and culture. According to Sánchez, Teatro Avante was created in order to provide a venue for Spanish-language art theater in Miami. The company's first production was the play Electra Garrigó by the Cuban playwright Virgilio Piñera. In 1986, Teatro Avante began organizing and producing an annual theater festival, originally called the Festival of Hispanic Theatre. Four years later, the scope of the festival was expanded, and its name was changed to International Hispanic Theater Festival of Miami. In its most recent iteration, the festival highlighted the theater of Peru and was presented in collaboration with the Adrienne Arsht Center for the Performing Arts and the Teatro Prometeo of Miami-Dade College.

Teatro Avante has also represented the United States in international theater festivals, and it held a residency in 2009 at Spain's Festival de Teatro de Villa de Molina.

== Productions ==
Teatro Avante has produced a variety of plays ranging from classics to originals. Their productions debut annually during the International Hispanic Theatre Festival of Miami. In 2018, Teatro Avante held the world premiere of En ningún lugar del mundo (Nowhere in the World) by Cuban playwright Abel González Melo.

=== 1970s ===
- Electra Garrigó by Virgilio Piñera (1978)

=== 1980s ===
- Aire frío (Cold Air) by Virgilio Piñera (1981)
- Deborah (1981)
- Retired Ladies (Ladies in Retirement) by Percy & Denham (1981)
- Homage (1981)
- Same Time, Next Year by Bernard Slade (1981)
- A Streetcar Named Desire by Tennessee Williams (1982)
- Aire frío (Cold Air) by Virgilio Piñera (1982)
- Las niñas ricas de Camagüey (Rich Girls from Camagüey) adaptation by Eduardo Corbé (1982)
- Aqui ya es otoño (It's Already Autumn Here) (1982)
- Chapter Two by Neil Simon (1982)
- Who's Afraid of Virginia Woolf? by Edward Albee (1982)
- El flaco y el gordo (The Fat One and the Skinny One) by Virgilio Piñera (1983)
- Yo prefiero a Caballero (I Prefer Gentlemen) by Cristina Sánchez (1983)
- Desconcierto (Confusion) by Diana Raznovich (1983)
- The Lady of Larkspur Lotion by Tennessee Williams (1983)
- The Farm (La Finca) by George Orwell, adaptation by Mario Ernesto Sanchez (1983)
- Experimental Theatre Cycle (Ciclo de Teatro Experimental) (1983)
- Los monstruos sagrados (The Sacred Monsters) by Jean Cocteau (1983)
- Don Gil de las calzas verdes (Don Gil of the Green Breeches) by Tirso de Molina (1983)
- Recuerdos de Tulipa (Souvenirs from Tulipa) by Manuel Reguera Saumell (1983)
- Tres Tristes Tigres (Three Trapped Tigers) by Guillermo Cabrera Infante (1983)
- I Never Saw Another Butterfly by Celeste Raspanti (1984)
- Soul Gone Home (1984)
- PIcnic on the Battlefield by Fernando Arrabal (1984)
- Las brujas de Salem (The Witches of Salem) by Alberto Sarraín (1984)
- Lorca or the Language of Love (Lorca o el lenguaje de amor) (1984)
- The Love of Don Perlimplín and Belisa in the Garden by Federico García Lorca (1984)
- Waiting for to Go (1985)
- The Past is the Past by Richard Wesley (1985)
- The Miracle Worker by William Gibson (1985)
- Alguna cosita que alivie el sufrir (A Little Something to Ease the Pain) by Alberto Sarraín (1986)
- False Alarm by René Alejandro Pérez (1986)
- Aire frío (Cold Air) by Virgilio Piñera (1986)
- Una caja de zapatos vacía (An Empty Shoe Box) by Luis González-Cruz (1987)
- La Chunga by Mario Vargas Llosa (1988)
- Bodas de sangre (Blood Wedding) by Federico García Lorca (1988)
- La noche de los asesinos (Night of the Assassins) by José Triana (1989)

=== 1990s ===
- El día que me quieras (The Day You'll Want Me) by José Ignacio Cabrujas (1990)
- La Farce du chateau by Jean Cocteau (1990)
- La Voix humaine (The Human Voice) by Jean Cocteau (1990)
- La Fantome de Marseille (The Ghost of Marseille) by Jean Cocteau (1990)
- Las galas del difunto (The Deceased's Finery) by Ramón del Valle-Inclán (1991)
- Ligazón (Connection) by Ramón del Valle-Inclán (1991)
- The Three Little Pigs and the Big Bad Wolf (Los tres cerditos y el lobo carnicero) by René Ariza (1991)
- A quien pueda interesar o His Master Voice (Who Might be Interested or His Master Voice) by Myriam Acevedo (1991)
- El extravío (The Loss) by Julio Matas (1992)
- Tres tazas de trigo (Three Cups of Wheat) by Salvador Lemis (1993)
- Matecumbe: el vuelo de un Pedro Pan (Matecumbe: the Flight of a Peter Pan) by Mario Ernesto Sánchez (1994)
- Jesús (Jesus) by Virgilio Piñera (1994)
- Looking at the Lay (Mirando al tendido) (1995)
- Hazme de la noche un cuento by Jorge Márquez (1996)
- Lola (1996)
- Los fantasmas de Tulemón (The Ghosts of Tulemón) by Gilberto Pinto (1997)
- La Peregrina (The Pilgrim) by Héctor Santiago (1998)
- Los fantasmas de Tulemón (The Ghosts of Tulemón) (1999)
- La muerte y la doncella (Death and the Maiden) by Ariel Dorfman (1999)

=== 2000s ===
- Lila, La Mariposa (Lila the Butterfly) by Rolando Ferrer (2000)
- Cenizas sobre el mar (Ashes on the Sea) by Jose Assad (2001)
- La feria de los inventos (The Fair of Discoveries) by Lilliam Vega and Raquel Carrió (2002)
- El vuelo de Quijote (Don Quixote's Flight) by Lilliam Vega and Raquel Carrió (2003)
- The Immaculate Man (El Hombre Immaculado) (2004)
- La feria de los inventos (The Fair of Discoveries) by Lilliam Vega and Raquel Carrió (2004)
- Una caja de zapatos vacía (An Empty Shoe Box) by Virgilio Piñera (2005)
- El filántropo (The Philanthropist) by Virgilio Piñera, adapted by Raquel Carrio (2005)
- The Tempest by William Shakespeare, adapted by Raquel Carrio (2006)
- Yerma by Federico García Lorca, adapted by Raquel Carrio (2007)
- Celestina (novel)|La Celestina by Fernando de Rojas, adapted by Raquel Carrio (2008)
- Cold Air (Aire frío) by Virgilio Piñera, adapted by Raquel Carrio (2009)

=== 2010s ===
- Por las tierras de Colón (Across Columbus' Land) by Guillermo Schmidhuber (2010)
- The Misunderstanding by Albert Camus (2011)
- El No (No) by Virgilio Piñera (2012)
- Al pie del Támesis (On the Banks of the Thames) by Mario Vargas Llosa (2013)
- Años difíciles (Difficult Years) by Roberto Cossa (2014)
- Alguna cosita que alivie el sufrir (A Little Something to Ease the Pain) by Rene R. Aloma (2015)
- El puerto de los cristales rotos (The Harbor of Broken Glass) by Mario Ernesto Sánchez and Patricia Suárez (2016)
- Notas que saben a olvido (Forgetting) by Araceli Mariel Arreche (2017)
- La última felicidad (The Last Happiness) by Neher Jacqueline Briceño (2018)
- En ningún lugar del mundo (Nowhere in the World) by Abel González Melo (2018)
- Bayamesa by Abel González Melo (2019)

=== 2020s ===
- Ubú Pandemia (Ubú Pandemic) by Abel González Melo (2021)

== Works or publications ==
- Sanchez, Mario Ernesto; et al. (1995). Matecumbe : el vuelo de un Pedro Pan. Miami, FL: GC Video Productions. OCLC 847755647.
