= Yumurí y sus Hermanos =

Yumurí y sus Hermanos is a Cuban band led by Moisés Valle (Yumurí) since September 1992.

The band consists of Moisés and three of his four brothers. In 1993 they won prizes for the best new band of the year en the Cuban TV show "Mi Salsa". The arrangements are done by Orlando Valle, former member of Irakere. In 1994 the band toured Japan. In 1997, Yumurí played in the show Cuba Tropical in Japan, Venezuela, Panama, the United States, Mexico, Switzerland, and France.

== Discography ==
- Cocodrilo de Agua Salá Magic Music / Spain. 1993.
- Provocación Victor Entertainment / Japan. 1996.
- Olvídame si puedes Bis Music / Cuba. 1999.
- Bilongo 2002.
- Salsa y Candela 2004.
- Casa De La Musica Bis Music / Cuba. CD/DVD 2005.
