= 2025 in Cuba =

- Decades: 2000s; 2010s; 2020s
- See also: Other events of 2025; Timeline of Cuban history

This article covers events in the year 2025 in Cuba.

== Incumbents ==
- First Secretary of the Communist Party of Cuba: Miguel Díaz-Canel
- President of Cuba: Miguel Díaz-Canel
  - Vice President of Cuba: Salvador Valdés Mesa
- Prime Minister of Cuba: Manuel Marrero Cruz

== Events ==
=== January ===
- January 7 – Thirteen soldiers are killed in an explosion at an ammunition depot in Melones, Holguín Province.
- January 17 – South Korea opens an embassy in Cuba for the first time.

=== February ===
- February 4 – The United States begins transporting detained migrants to its naval base in Guantanamo Bay.

=== March ===
- March 14 – A systems failure at the Diezmero electric substation outside Havana causes a nationwide blackout.

=== April ===
- April 29 – Dissidents José Daniel Ferrer and Félix Navarro Rodríguez, who were released as part of an agreement between the Cuban government and the United States in January, are rearrested after their paroles are revoked.

=== June ===
- 4 June – US President Donald Trump issues a proclamation imposing partial restrictions on Cuban nationals travelling to the United States.

=== July ===
- 11 July – The United States imposes sanctions on First Secretary Miguel Díaz-Canel, Defense Minister Álvaro López Miera and Interior Minister Lázaro Álvarez Casas for their role in human rights violations.
- 15 July – Marta Elena Feitó Cabrera resigns as Minister of Labor and Social Security following criticism over her remarks questioning the presence of beggars in the country.

=== September ===
- 10 September – A malfunction at a thermoelectric plant causes a nationwide blackout.
- 18 September – Leyanis Pérez wins the gold medal at the women's triple jump of the 2025 World Athletics Championships in Tokyo, Japan.

=== October ===
- 13 October – Dissident José Daniel Ferrer is released and goes into exile in Florida following a request by the US government.

=== December ===
- 3 December – A failure at a transmission line causes a blackout that affects western Cuba, including Havana.
- 8 December – Former economy minister Alejandro Gil Fernández is sentenced to life imprisonment on charges of spying.

== Art and entertainment ==
- List of Cuban submissions for the Academy Award for Best International Feature Film

== Holidays ==
- January 1 – Liberation Day
- January 2 – Victoria Day
- April 18 – Good Friday
- May 1 – Labour Day
- July 25–28 – Day of the National Rebellion
- October 10 – Independence Day
- December 25 – Christmas Day

== Deaths ==
- January 4 – Gerardo Fernández, 71, Olympic weightlifter (1976, 1980).
- January 9 – Jorge Luis Sánchez, 64, film director (El Benny, Buscando a Casal).
- January 19 – Lázaro Aristides Betancourt, 88, Olympic hurdler (1964).
- January 28 – Jorge Luis Valdés, 63, baseball player, Olympic champion (1992).
- February 5 – Waldo Díaz-Balart, 93, artist.
- March 1 – Paulito FG, 63, salsa and timba musician.
- March 3 – Lincoln Díaz-Balart, 70, politician, member of the U.S. House of Representatives (1993–2011).
- March 4 – José Valdivielso, 89, baseball player (Washington Senators / Minnesota Twins).
- March 5 – Edesio Alejandro, 66, singer, guitarist and composer (Clandestinos, Hello Hemingway).
- March 26 – Manuel Hilario de Céspedes y García Menocal, 81, Roman Catholic prelate, bishop of Matanzas (2005–2022).
- March 30 – Eloína Echevarría, 63, long jumper and triple jumper.
- March 30 – Silvina Fabars, 81, folk dancer.
- April 10 – Mario Ernesto Sánchez, 78, actor (Miami Vice, The Specialist) and businessman, founder and director of Teatro Avante.
- April 14 – Leandro Civil, 77, Olympic middle-distance runner (1976).
- May 16 – René Bonora, 73, Olympic footballer (1976).
- May 17 – Osmany Cienfuegos, 94, politician.
- June 6 – Changuito, 76, percussionist.
- June 24 – Diego Seguí, 87, baseball player (St. Louis Cardinals, Boston Red Sox, Seattle Mariners).
- July 11 – Luis Sharpe, 65, American football player (Arizona Cardinals).
- July 30 – Felipe de la Pozas, 91, Olympic basketball player (1952).
- August 17 – Humberto Calzada, 81, artist.
- August 28 – Walfredo de los Reyes, 92, percussionist.
- September 16 – Ricardo Cabrisas, 88, vice president of the Council of Ministers (2008–2019), minister of foreign trade and investment (2023–2024)
- September 18 – Miguel Calderón Gómez, 74, basketball player (national team), Olympic bronze medallist (1972).
- September 25 – Assata Shakur, 78, American-born political activist and defector to Cuba
- October 25 – Miriam Learra, 88, actress (The Teacher, The Galíndez File, 7 Days in Havana).
- November 6 – Manuel Pérez, 85, film director and screenwriter (The Man from Maisinicu).
- November 9 – Lázaro Beltrán, 61, Olympic volleyball player (1992).
- November 19 – Francisco Centelles, 64, Olympic high jumper (1980).
- November 27 – Raul Santoserpa, 86, painter and engraver.
- December 17 – Elías Barreiro, 95, guitarist and academic.
- December 18 – Héctor Luis Lucas Peña Gómez, 96, Roman Catholic prelate, auxiliary bishop of Santiago de Cuba (1970–1979) and bishop of Holguín (1979–2005).

== See also ==
- 2020s
- 2025 Atlantic hurricane season
- 2025 in the Caribbean
