= 2026 in Cuba =

- Decades: 2000s; 2010s; 2020s
- See also: Other events of 2026; Timeline of Cuban history

This article covers events in the year 2026 in Cuba.

== Incumbents ==
- First Secretary of the Communist Party of Cuba: Miguel Díaz-Canel
- President of Cuba: Miguel Díaz-Canel
  - Vice President of Cuba: Salvador Valdés Mesa
- Prime Minister of Cuba: Manuel Marrero Cruz

== Events ==
=== January ===
- 3 January – 2026 Cuban crisis: The US puts sanctions on oil sent to Cuba after the intervention in Venezuela, starting a crisis.
- 4 January – The government confirms that 32 members of its security forces were killed during the 2026 United States strikes in Venezuela the previous day and declares two days of national mourning beginning on 5 January.
- 27 January – Mexico suspends oil shipments to Cuba.
- 29 January – US president Donald Trump issues an executive order imposing tariffs on countries exporting oil to Cuba.

=== February ===
- 3 February – The lowest temperature recorded in Cuba is measured at 0 °C (32 °F) at a weather station in Matanzas Province.
- 8 February – Nicaragua suspends visa-free entry for Cuban nationals.
- 9 February – Air Canada suspends flights to Cuba, citing ongoing fuel shortages in the country.
- 11 February
  - Cuba–Russia relations: Russian airliners Rossiya and Nordwind suspend flights to Cuba, citing ongoing fuel shortages in the island.
  - Canada–Cuba relations: Canadian airlines Air Transat and WestJet suspend all flights to Cuba amid a fuel shortage for commercial aviation.
  - Cuba–Mexico relations: Mexico confirms it suspended all fuel shipments to Cuba to avoid punitive tariffs by the United States, but vows to continue shipments of humanitarian aid.
- 13 February – A fire breaks out at the Ñico López Refinery in Havana.
- 14 February – Organizers announce the indefinite postponement of the 2026 edition of the Habanos Cigar Festival.
- 25 February –
  - 2026 Cuban boat incident: The Cuban coast guard kills four people on a United States-registered speedboat near Cayo Falcones during a shoot-out. Six boat passengers are injured.
  - The United States allows the export of Venezuelan oil to Cuba for humanitarian purposes.
- 28 February – Ten Panamanian nationals are arrested in Havana on suspicion of fabricating subversive propaganda.

=== March ===
- 3 March – Ecuador expels the Cuban ambassador, José María Borja, and his entire diplomatic staff for unspecified reasons.
- 4 March –
  - 2026 Cuban crisis: Air France announces the suspension of flights between Paris and Havana, from March 29 until at least June 15 due to a jet fuel shortage in Cuba.
  - 2024–2026 Cuba blackouts: A major blackout across much of western Cuba, including the capital Havana, leaves millions without power. Officials estimate it will last at least 72 hours.
  - Honduras cancels a cooperation agreement with Cuba that allowed Cuban medical professionals to operate in the country.
- 5 March – Jamaica cancels a cooperation agreement with Cuba that allowed Cuban medical professionals to operate in the country.
- 6 March – Cuba closes its embassy in Ecuador.
- 13 March – First Secretary Miguel Díaz-Canel confirms that Cuba is in talks with the Trump administration to find solutions to the oil blockade in the country.
- 14 March – Authorities arrest five people after protesters damage and set fire to a Communist Party office in Morón, Ciego de Ávila Province, during demonstrations over prolonged blackouts and shortages of basic goods.
- 16 March –
  - The government announces that citizens living abroad will be permitted to invest in and own businesses in the country as it seeks to expand commercial activity amid an economic crisis.
  - A nationwide power outage occurs following a total electrical grid collapse.
- 18 March – Costa Rica breaks diplomatic relations with Cuba and closes its embassy in Havana.
- 20 March – The United States says it will not allow Cuba to receive any shipments of fuel oil from Russia as two Russian tankers are en route to Havana to deliver around 190,000 barrels of oil amid a critical shortage on the island.
- 22 March – Power is restored after the power grid collapsed the previous day.
- 26 March – The Mexican Navy launches a search and rescue operation in the Caribbean Sea for two sailboats which departed from Isla Mujeres with nine crew members, carrying humanitarian aid to Cuba after they failed to arrive in Havana as scheduled and lost communication. The missing vessels and crew are found safe on 29 March some 80 nautical miles from Havana.
- 30 March – A Russian shadow fleet tanker carrying 100,000 tonnes of crude oil arrives in Cuba, defying a U.S. blockade of the island.

=== April ===
- 2 April – Cuba announces the pardon of 2,010 prisoners, with releases scheduled over the coming months based on criteria such as conduct and health.

=== May ===
- 13 May – Energy minister Vicente de la O Levy announces the exhaustion of the country's diesel and fuel oil supplies.
- 14 May – A fuel shortage causes a blackout in the eastern half of the island from Guantánamo to Ciego de Ávila Provinces.
- 20 May – The United States files charges against former first secretary Raul Castro over the 1996 shootdown of Brothers to the Rescue aircraft.
- 26 May – Spain-based Meliá Hotels International announces the closure of 15 of its 34 hotels in Cuba, citing in part "external factors".

=== June ===
- 5 June – The US imposes sanctions on first secretary Miguel Díaz-Canel, his wife, and three other Cuban nationals.
- 8 June – A magnitude 6.1 earthquake hits off Pinar del Rio, making it the strongest earthquake recorded in the Gulf of Mexico.
- 18 June – The Communist Party of Cuba approves an economic package legislation that includes new free-market reforms including an expansion of private enterprises, an increase of autonomy for municipalities and state-owned companies, and measures intended to attract additional foreign investment.
- 23 June – The US imposes sanctions on five state-controlled entities, including three connected to GAESA.

=== July ===
- 6 July – An island-wide blackout hits the country.
- 10 July – An island-wide blackout hits the country.
- 14 July – An island-wide blackout hits the country.

=== August ===
- 2 August – An island-wide blackout hits the country.

=== September ===
- 18 September – An island-wide blackout hits the country.

== Art and entertainment ==
- List of Cuban submissions for the Academy Award for Best International Feature Film

== Holidays ==
- 1 January – Liberation Day
- 2 January – Victoria Day
- 3 April – Good Friday
- 1 May – Labour Day
- 25–27 July – National Revolutionary Day
- 10 October – Independence Day
- 25 December – Christmas Day
- 31 December – New Year's Eve

== Deaths ==
- 10 January – Manolo Villaverde, 91, actor (¿Qué Pasa, USA?, Taina, Wiseguy).
- 28 February – Roberto Castrillo, 84, sport shooter, Olympic bronze medalist (1980).
- 11 March – Marcelino Miyares Sotolongo, 88, politician-in-exile and marketing executive.
- 6 April – Danny Miranda, 47, baseball player, Olympic champion (2004).
- 17 April – Jorge Enrique Serpa Pérez, 84, Roman Catholic prelate, bishop of Pinar del Río (2006–2019).
- 13 May – Dionisio Quintana, 68, javelin thrower and trainer.
- 30 May – Héctor Maseda Gutiérrez, 83, nuclear engineer and journalist.
- 13 June – Silvano Pedroso Montalvo, 73, Roman Catholic prelate, bishop of Guantánamo-Baracoa (since 2018).
- 21 June – Ramiro Valdés Menéndez, 94, revolutionary and politician, vice president of the Council of State (2009–2019), and minister of the interior (1961–1968, 1979–1985).
- 14 July – José Legrá, 83, boxer, WBC featherweight champion (1968–1969, 1972–1973).
- 1 August –
  - Alexeis Argilagos, 51, Olympic volleyball player (2000).
  - Francisco Mora, 74, Olympic rower (1976, 1980).
- 3 August –
  - Paula Alí, 88, actress
  - Alfonso Fanjul Jr., 89, sugar refining and real estate executive (Domino Foods).
- 29 September – Otto Sirgo, 79, actor (I Do ... Knot, Un gancho al corazón, Por ella soy Eva).
- 1 October – Mario Mestril, 86, Roman Catholic prelate, auxiliary bishop of Camagüey (1991–1996) and bishop of Ciego de Ávila (1996–2017).

== See also ==
- 2020s
- 2026 Atlantic hurricane season
- 2026 in the Caribbean
