= 2021 in Cuba =

- Decades: 2000s; 2010s; 2020s
- See also: Other events of 2021; Timeline of Cuban history

This article covers events in the year 2021 in Cuba.

== Events ==
=== January and February ===
- January 1
  - The United States adds Banco Financiero International SA (BFI) to the Cuba Restricted List. The Trump administration is considering adding Cuba to its list of state-sponsored terrorism.
  - Cuba eliminates the "convertible peso" used in government establishments valued at 24 pesos/dollar for sales and 25 pesos/dollar for purchases. This is the first devaluation of the peso since the Revolution of 1959.
  - The minimum wage increases from 400 pesos to 2,100 pesos (US$17 to US$87).
- January 11 – The United States re-lists Cuba as State Sponsors of Terrorism. President Obama removed Cuba from the list in 2015.
- January 29
  - Thousands protest against and demand the resignation of Alpidio Alonso, Minister of Culture, for injuries and invasion of privacy. The demands came after a confrontation with entertainers and independent journalists who demanded more freedom of expression.
  - Cuban Revolutionary Armed Forces report that five soldiers are killed in a crash in Holguín Province.
- January 30
  - The Pentagon pauses its plans to provide voluntary COVID-19 vaccines to the forty prisoners held at the Guantanamo Bay detention camp.
  - Ten teachers are killed and 24 injured in a bus accident in Güines, Mayabeque Province.
- February 6 – Labor Minister Marta Elena Feito Cabrera says the list of permitted small businesses will expand from 127 to 2,000 activities.
- February 18 – Granma denounces the popular song Patria y Vida (″Homeland and Life″) which is being popularized by Yotuel Romero, Descemer Bueno, Gente de Zona, Maikel Osorbo, and El Funky.
- February 26 – José Daniel Ferrer of the Unión Patriótica de Cuba (Patriotic Union of Cuba, UNPACU) is arrested in Altamira, Santiago de Cuba. The United States demanded his release.

=== March and April ===
- March 5 – Sandro Castro, 29, grandson of Fidel Castro, apologizes for showing off an expensive Mercedes-Benz at 140 km (87 mi) per hour while the country is facing an economic crisis and food shortages.
- March 6 – Seven migrants are stopped at Islamorada and one at Duck Key in the Florida Keys. The U.S. has returned 87 people from Cuba trying to reach Florida by sea since October 1, 2020.
- March 31 – Russia and Cuba begin two days of high-level diplomatic talks.
- April 19 – At the 8th Congress of the Communist Party, Raúl Castro officially resigned as the First Secretary, the most powerful position in Cuba. Cuban President Miguel Díaz-Canel is officially named First Secretary of the Communist Party following the resignation of Raúl Castro. He is the first person not of the Castro family to hold the top position since the 1959 Cuban Revolution.

=== July ===
- July 11 – Biggest anti-government protests in years over the worst economic crisis since the 1990s and surges in COVID-19 infections, with protesters expressing anger over shortages of basic goods, curbs on civil liberties, and the government's handling of the COVID-19 pandemic in Cuba.

== Deaths ==
- January 14 – Enrique Pineda Barnet, 87, film director and screenwriter (I Am Cuba).
- January 18 – Juan Carlos Tabío, 77, film director (Strawberry and Chocolate, Lista de Espera, 7 Days in Havana).
- February 15 – Gregorio Américo Pérez Valdés, 79, baseball player; prostate cancer.
- March 3 – Dagoberto Planos Despaigne, 64, singer; cirrhosis.
- March 20 – Orbe Luis Rodríguez, 58, baseball player (Industriales, Metropolitanos); cardiorespiratory arrest.

== See also ==
- 2021 Atlantic hurricane season
- COVID-19 pandemic in North America
