= Charles Warren Currier =

Bishop Charles Warren Currier
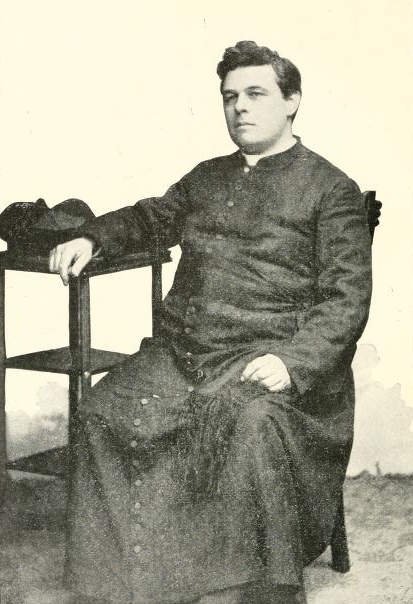
- Born: March 22, 1857; St. Thomas, Virgin Islands, Danish West Indies
- Died: September 23, 1918 (aged 61); Maryland, U.S.

Bishop Charles Warren Currier (March 22, 1857 – September 23, 1918) was the first bishop of the Roman Catholic Diocese of Matanzas (1913–1914). His parents were Warren Green Currier (born in New York) and Deborah Heyliger of the Netherlands. Charles Currier was born in Saint Thomas, U.S. Virgin Islands.

He studied at the College of Our Lady of the Assumption, Roermond, Limburg, the Netherlands, and at Saint Alphonsus Seminary in Wittem, Limburg. He joined the missionary order the Congregation of the Most Holy Redeemer (Redemptorists) in 1875 and was ordained a priest on November 24, 1880, in Amsterdam by Bishop Henry Schaap (vicar apostolic of Surinam). In January 1881, he arrived in Surinam for his first missionary assignment where he remained until 1882. In November 1891 he was allowed to leave the Redemptorists and then worked in the Archdiocese of Baltimore.

On June 25, 1910, he was appointed Bishop of Zamboanga, Philippines, by Pope Pius X, but he declined. Because he had published articles on Cuban history, he was appointed on April 26, 1913, as the first Bishop of Matanzas. In Rome, on July 6, 1913, he was consecrated by Cardinal Diomede Falconio, O.F.M., and assisted by Domenico Serafini, titular archbishop of Seleucia Pieria, and Donato Sbarretti, titular archbishop of Ephesus, bishop emeritus of Havana.

He arrived in Matanzas on November 3, 1913, and took position of the archdiocese the following day. He repaired and redecorated the Cathedral of San Carlos Borromeo that was in poor condition. Due to his poor health he resigned his position as Bishop of the Archdiocese of Matanzas on February 11, 1914, and was appointed titular bishop of Etalonia on June 15, 1915.

Bishop Currier knew Greek and Hebrew and was fluent in Latin, English, Dutch, Spanish, French, German, and Italian.

Bishop Currier died on September 23, 1918, on a train traveling from Waldorf, Maryland, to Baltimore to assist in the funeral of Cardinal John Murphy Farley, archbishop of the Archdiocese of New York. His funeral took place in the Cathedral of Baltimore, where he is also buried.

== Selected publications ==
- History of Religious Orders (1898)

Catholic Church titles
Preceded by None	Bishop of Matanzas; 1913–1914	Succeeded by Severiano Sainz y Bencamo
