= 2022 in Cuba =

- Decades: 2000s; 2010s; 2020s
- See also: Other events of 2022; Timeline of Cuban history

This article covers events in the year 2022 in Cuba.

== Events ==
- May 6 - Hotel Saratoga explosion: At least 26 people are killed and at least 74 others are injured by an explosion caused by a suspected gas leak at the Hotel Saratoga in Havana.
- June 6 - The Biden administration bans the presidents of Cuba, Venezuela, and Nicaragua from attending this year's Summit of the Americas in Los Angeles, United States. Mexican President Andrés Manuel López Obrador announces that he will personally boycott the meeting in response to the ban, sending Foreign Secretary Marcelo Ebrard to represent him at the summit.
- June 24 - 2021 Cuban protests: A court in Cuba sentences two protesters to between five and nine years in prison for desecrating the Cuban flag and resisting authority during last year's protests.
- July 7 - Authorities in Cuba say that dengue fever cases have increased 21.7% from last year and describe the epidemiological situation as "complex".
- August 6 - One person is killed and at least 121 others are injured after a lightning strike causes a fire near the supertanker port in Matanzas.
- August 9 - Matanzas oil storage facility explosion: Firefighters in Cuba bring a catastrophic fire at an oil terminal in Matanzas under control after it burned out of control for five consecutive days, destroying 40% of the country's main fuel storage facility and causing widespread blackouts.
- August 17 - The death toll from the August 6 fire at a supertanker port in Matanzas rises to 16. All the deceased were firefighters who were battling the blaze.
- August 20 - Cuba confirms its first case of monkeypox.
- September 25 - 66.9% of Cubans vote in favor a new Family Code in a national referendum, which includes the legalization of same-sex marriage.
- November 27 - 2022 Cuban local elections

== Deaths ==
- January 3 – Gina Cabrera, 93, actor.
- January 13 - Cholly Naranjo, 87, baseball player.
- January 13 - Raúl Vilches, 67, volleyball player.
- January 18 - Hilario Candela, 87, architect.
- February 12 - Carmen Herrera, 106, artist.
- February 12 - Aurelio de la Vega, 96, composer.
- April 10 - Estela Rodríguez, 54, Judoku.
- April 30 - Ricardo Alarcón, 84, politician.
- June 8 - Isabel Álvarez, 88, baseball player.
- June 23 - Leo Posada, 88, baseball player.
- June 27 - Fina García Marruz, 99, poet.
- July 1 - Luis Alberto Rodríguez López-Calleja, 62, politician.
- July 6 - Ed Bauta, 87, baseball player.
- July 7 - Mike Brito, 87, baseball scout.
- July 10 - Juan Roca Brunet, 71, basketball player.
- July 15 - José Ramón Balaguer Cabrera, 90, politician.
- July 17 - César Pedroso, 75, pianist.
- August 4 - Agustín Drake Aldama, 87, sculptor.
- August 23 - Rolando Cubela Secades, 89, revolutionary.

== See also ==
- 2022 Atlantic hurricane season
- COVID-19 pandemic in North America
