= Vivanco =

Vivanco is a Spanish-language surname. Notable people with the surname include:

- Manuel Ignacio de Vivanco (1806–1873), Peruvian politician and military leader
- Mariano Vivanco Valiente (1933–2004), Cuban Bishop
- Sebastián de Vivanco (c. 1551–1622), Spanish priest and composer
- William Vivanco (born 1975), Cuban singer-songwriter
- Hernán Carrasco Vivanco (1923–2023), Chilean soccer manager
- Braulio Orue-Vivanco (1843–1904), Cuban Bishop
- José Miguel Vivanco (born 1961), Executive Director of Human Rights Watch, Americas Division
