= Vivancos =

Vivancos is a surname. Notable people with the surname include:

- Albert Vivancos (born 1994), Spanish footballer
- Felipe Vivancos (born 1980), Spanish hurdler
- Miguel García Vivancos (1895–1972), Spanish painter and anarchist

== See also ==
- Vivanco
