= Severiano Sainz y Bencamo =

Bishop Severiano Sainz y Bencamo
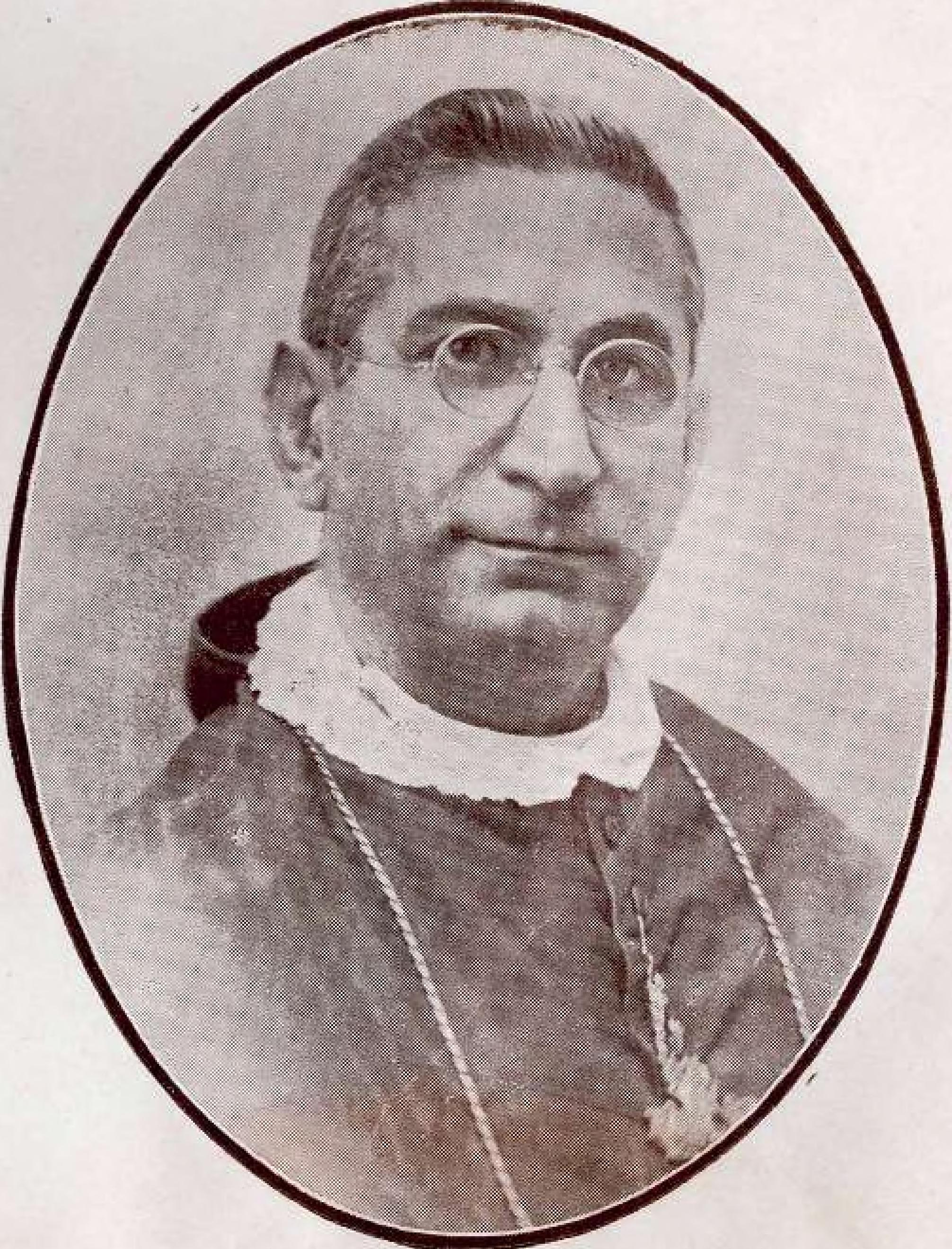
- Born: November 7, 1871; Pinar del Río, Captaincy General of Cuba, Spanish Empire
- Died: March 14, 1937 (aged 65); Matanzas, Cuba
- Resting place: Necropolis de San Carlos Borromeo
- Occupation: Second Bishop of the Roman Catholic Diocese of Matanzas (1915–1937)
- Known for: Administrator of Cementerio Cristóbal Colón

Bishop Severiano Sainz y Bencamo (7 November 1871 in Pinar del Río, Cuba - 14 March 1937 in Matanzas, Cuba) was the second bishop of the Roman Catholic Diocese of Matanzas (1915–1937). His parents were Juan Sainz y María Antonia Bencomo.

When he was very young he was taken to Spain and commenced his studies with the Jesuits in Orduña. He later returned to Cuba and in 1891 he was studying at the San Carlos and San Ambrosio Seminary. He was ordained a priest on 23 December 1898 by Mons. Manuel Santander y Frutos Bishop of Havana. On 19 September 1907, he was named Administrator of Cementerio Cristóbal Colón. In 1914, he was offered the Archdiocese of Santiago de Cuba and refused.

He was appointed Bishop of the Diocese of Matanzas by Pope Benedict XV on 11 February 1915 and consecrated in the Cathedral of Matanzas on 3 May 1915 by Mons. Adolfo Alejandro Nouel Bobadilla, Archbishop of the Archdiocese of Santo Domingo assisted by Mons. Manuel Ruiz y Rodríguez, Bishop of the Diocese of Pinar del Río, and Mons. Pedro González Estrada, Bishop of Havana. Bishop Sainz died in Matanzas on 14 March 1937 and was buried in Necropolis de San Carlos Borromeo.
