= Arozarena =

Arozarena is a surname. Notable people with the surname include:

- Rafael Arozarena (1923–2009), Spanish poet and novelist
- Raiko Arozarena (born 1997), Cuban footballer
- Renny Arozarena (born 1971), Cuban actor
- Randy Arozarena (born 1995), Mexican baseball player
