= Duck Key =

Island in the middle Florida Keys, United States

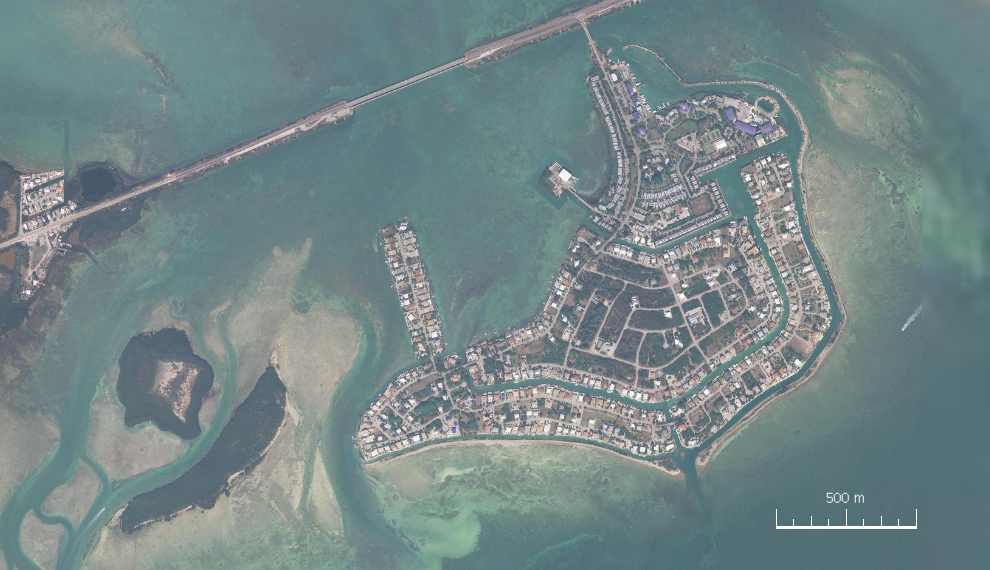
- Satellite image of Duck Key and Toms Harbor Keys

- Duck Key Duck Key (the Caribbean)

Geography
- Location: Gulf of Mexico
- Coordinates: 24°46′13.8″N 80°54′42.4″W
- Archipelago: Florida Keys
- Adjacent to: Florida Straits

Administration
- United States
- State: Florida
- County: Monroe

Duck Key is an island in Monroe County, Florida, United States, in the middle Florida Keys. It is part of the Duck Key, Florida census-designated place. The CDP also includes the neighboring island of Conch Key.

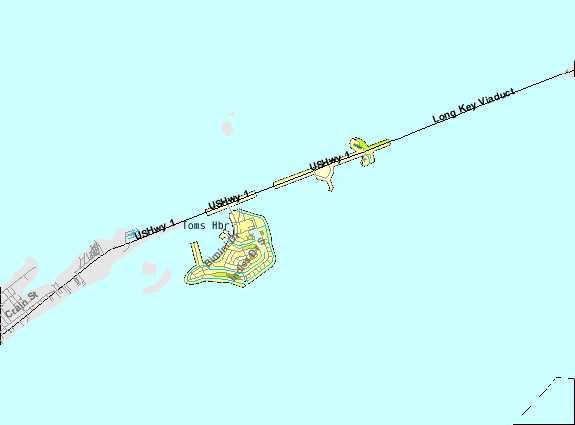
Map of the CDP of Duck Key, Florida showing boundaries

== History ==
The key was the site of a salt manufacturing operation in the 1820s & 1830s. Occupation of the island ceased after the Labor Day Hurricane of 1935 and did not resume until the key was connected to the highway by a causeway in 1953. J.W. Norie, in his Piloting Directions for the Gulf of Florida, The Bahama Bank & Islands (1828) states: "Duck Key - Some two miles (3 km) long, low, rocky, & covered with mangroves; some small patches of good land with a little timber. This island formerly saltworks but they were transferred latterly to Key West, owned by Mr. Howe, who is also possessor of this Key." Hawk's Cay Resort is currently located here, and the island is sometimes known by that name. Noted Michigan Senate leader, Emil Lockwood, retired in Duck Key, where he served in many civic and political capacities until his death in 2002.

== Geography ==
Duck Key is located oceanside of U.S. 1 (or the Overseas Highway), at approximately mile marker 61, between Conch Key and Grassy Key.
