= Little Conch Key =

Island in Florida, United States

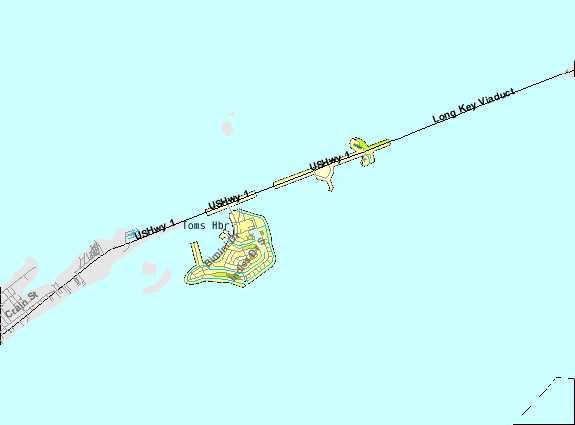
- U.S. Census Bureau map of Duck Key CDP showing boundaries which include Little Conch Key

- Little Conch Key Little Conch Key (the Caribbean)

Geography
- Location: Gulf of Mexico
- Coordinates: 24.784689°N 80.896711°W
- Archipelago: Florida Keys
- Adjacent to: Florida Straits

Administration
- United States
- State: Florida
- County: Monroe

Little Conch Key is an island in Monroe County, Florida, United States. Little Conch Key is also known as Walker's Island.

== History ==
The first notable mention and use of the name Conch Key is by F. W. Gerdes in his Reconnaissance of the Florida Reefs and All the Keys in 1849, "The first islands between Duck Key and Viper Id. Long Key are named Conch Keys." This was in reference to Little Conch, at the time named Walker Key.

== Geography ==
It is located in the middle Florida Keys. U.S. 1 (the Overseas Highway) crosses the key at approximately mile marker 62.2, between Duck Key and Conch Key. It is part of the census-designated place of Duck Key.

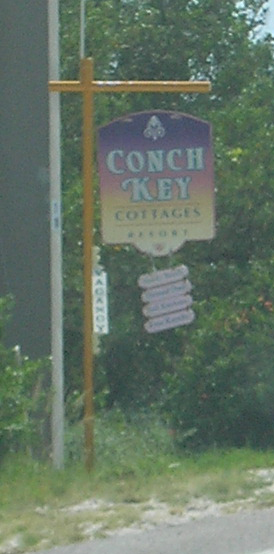
Sign for 'Conch Key Cottages' on Little Conch Key
