= Jorge Luis Sánchez =

Cuban film director (1960–2025)

Jorge Luis Sánchez (21 January 1960 – 9 January 2025) was a Cuban film director. He was a founder of the Federación Nacional de Cine Clubes de Cuba (National Federation of Cine Clubs of Cuba).

== Life and career ==
Sánchez was born on 21 January 1960. He started to work in ICAIC in 1981 as camera assistant, and later as assistant director. He subsequently worked on productions which include ''Baraguá'', ''Clandestinos'', ‘’Un señor muy viejo con unas alas enormes'', ''Papeles secundarios'' and ''Hello Hemingway'', and served as deputy artistic director of the ''Noticiero ICAIC Latinoamericano’’. His early works include ''El Fanguito'' (1990), one of his best-known documentaries, which he directed while working within the emerging independent film movement associated with the Taller de Cine of the Asociación Hermanos Saíz.

His first feature El Benny was presented at the Locarno International Film Festival in August 2006, where its star Renny Arozarena won the Boccalino prize for best performance for protagonist in all sections of festival. The film was Cuba's candidate for the Academy Awards. Sánchez is distantly related to Cuban musician and the subject of this film Benny Moré. The film received several awards.

Sánchez subsequently directed the feature films Irremediablemente juntos (2012), Cuba libre (2015). Cuba libre, a historical drama set during the final stages of the Spanish–American War, was produced by ICAIC. Sánchez had conceived the screenplay as early as 1998 and said that he wanted to tell the historical events through the perspective of two Cuban children. Buscando a Casal (2019) focused on the Cuban modernist poet Julián del Casal. It was selected for the 2019 International Festival of New Latin American Cinema in Havana and was Cuba's pre-candidate for the Academy Awards for Best International Feature Film.

In a 2006 published by ''Cine Cubano'', Sánchez described his view of cinema as a means of encouraging all audiences to engage with the subjects represented on screen. He said that films should entertain while also making viewers think. He described the role of the artist as a "manipulator of good”.

Sánchez died on 9 January 2025, at the age of 64.

== Filmography ==
- Amigos 1987 fiction, 30 min., 16 mm. Taller de Cine Asociación Hermanos Saíz.
- Diálogo 1988 documentary, 10 min, Vídeo Betacam. Taller de Cine Asociación Hermanos Saíz.
- Un Pedazo de Mí documentary, 15 min, 35 mm. Taller de Cine Asociación Hermanos Saíz-ICAIC.
- El Fanguito documentary, 1990 11 min, 35 mm. ICAIC.
- El Habanero news, 1990 7 min, 35 mm. ICAIC.
- Nietos y Abuelos documentary, 1990 13 min, 35 mm. ICAIC.
- Donde Está Casal documentary, 1990 13 min, 35 mm. ICAIC
- Adrenalina documentary, 199 113 min, 35 mm. ICAIC.
- El Cine y la Memoria documentary, 1992 13 min, 35 mm. ICAIC.
- Atrapando Espacio documentary, 1994 24 min, 35 mm. ICAIC.
- Y Me Gasto la Vida documentary, 1997 38 min, Vídeo Betacam. ICAIC.
- Patinando La Habana documentary, 1997 26 min, Vídeo Betacam. ICAIC.
- Culto a los Orishas teleseries doc. of 20 episodes, 1999 Video Betacam. Lucompa Producciones. Venezuela.
- Las Sombras Corrosivas de Fidelio Ponce Aun documentary, 1999 52 min, Vídeo Betacam. ICAIC
- Cero en Conducta documentary, 2003 13 min, Vídeo Betacam. ICAIC
- El Benny drama/musical, 2005-6 126 min, 35 mm. ICAIC-Coral Capital Entertainment
- Irremediablemente juntos drama, 2012 126 min, 35 mm. ICAIC-Coral Capital Entertainment
- Buscando a Casal drama/biopic, 2019 126 min, 35 mm. ICAIC-Coral Capital Entertainment

== Awards and nominations ==
- 1988 – Amigos – Special Award, First Young Film Festival, Havana.
- 1990 – El Fanguito – National Critics' Award for Best Documentary of the Year, Havana.
- 1990 – El Fanguito – Selected for the Annual Selection of Film Critics, Havana.
- 1990 – El Fanguito – Second Coral Award, 12th Festival of New Latin American Cinema, Havana.
- 1990 – El Fanguito – Special Mention, New York Latino Film Festival.
- 1991 – El Fanguito – Special Jury Prize and Special Mention for Cinematography, National Caracol Contest of UNEAC, Havana.
- 1992 – ¿Dónde está Casal? – Best Documentary, Best Screenplay and Bearded Caiman Award, 4th Young Film Festival, Havana.
- 1992 – ¿Dónde está Casal? – Best Documentary, Caracol Contest of UNEAC, Havana.
- 1995 – Atrapando Espacio – Special Mention of the Jury, Caracol Contest of UNEAC, Havana.
- 1995 – Atrapando Espacio – Second Award and Cinematography Award, Plaza Film Festival, Havana.
- 1999 – El registro en frío de la luna – Mention for Best Unpublished Screenplay, 20th Festival of New Latin American Cinema, Havana.
- 2006 – El Benny – Coral Award for Best First Feature, 28th Festival of New Latin American Cinema, Havana.
- 2006 – El Benny – El Mégano Award, National Federation of Film Clubs of Cuba, 28th Festival of New Latin American Cinema, Havana.
- 2006 – El Benny – Award from CUBADISCO and the Institute of Music, 28th Festival of New Latin American Cinema, Havana.
- 2006 – El Benny – Best Soundtrack, Radio Progreso Award, 28th Festival of New Latin American Cinema, Havana.
- 2006 – El Benny – Best Cinematography, Best Editing, Best Art Direction and Best Soundtrack, National Caracol Contest, Havana.
- 2007 – El Benny – Best First Feature, 9th International Film Festival of Santo Domingo.
- 2007 – El Benny – Popularity Award, 9th International Film Festival of Santo Domingo.
- 2007 – El Benny – Third Audience Prize for Best Film, 16th International Film Festival of Paraguay.
- 2007 – El Benny – Special Award for DVD, CUBADISCO, Havana.
- 2007 – El Benny – Honorable Mention, 9th Ibero-American Film Festival of Santa Cruz, Bolivia.
- 2008 – El Benny – Special Mention, 2nd Latin American Film Festival of Oaxaca, Mexico.
- 2015 – Cuba Libre – Coral Award for Best Poster, 37th Festival of New Latin American Cinema, Havana.
- 2015 – Cuba Libre – Award from the Cultural Circle of the Union of Cuban Journalists, 37th Festival of New Latin American Cinema, Havana.
- 2016 – Cuba Libre – Caracol Award for Editing, Caracol Contest, UNEAC.

=== Nominations and submissions ===
- 2006 – El Benny – Selected for the International Competition of the Locarno International Film Festival.
- 2007 – El Benny – Nominated for the Golden India Catalina for Best Film at the Cartagena Film Festival.
- 2006 – El Benny – Selected by Cuba as its submission for the Academy Award for Best Foreign Language Film.

=== Other recognition ===
- At the 59th Locarno International Film Festival, Renny Arozarena received the Boccalino Award for Best Actor for his performance in El Benny; the award was for Arozarena rather than Sánchez.

== See also ==
- Cinema of Cuba
