= WAZQ =

WAZQ may refer to:

- WAZQ (FM), a defunct radio station (89.3 FM) formerly licensed to serve Duck Key, Florida, United States
- WYBX, a radio station (88.3 FM) licensed to serve Key West, Florida, which held the call sign WAZQ from 2006 to 2009
