= Eduardo Reyes =

Eduardo Reyes may refer to:

- Captain Eduardo "Ed" Reyes, pilot who landed Philippine Airlines Flight 434 after attempted terrorism
- Eduardo Najarro Reyes, Rector of San Carlos and San Ambrosio Seminary
- Ed Reyes, Los Angeles City council member
- Eduardo Rodríguez (right-handed pitcher), middle relief pitcher
- Eduardo Reyes, a supervillain from DC Comics, also known as Wavelength
