= Eduardo Najarro Reyes =

Eduardo Najarro Reyes, S. J.
- Born: March 27, 1947 (age 77); Havana, Cuba

Fr. Eduardo Najarro Reyes, S.J. (born March 27, 1947, in Havana, Cuba); 8 de mayo de 2020, Santo Domingo, Republica Dominicana) was the Rector of San Carlos and San Ambrosio Seminary since March 2007 until November 2008.

Fr. Reyes lived near the Iglesia del Sagrado Corazon (Church of the Sacred Heart) the home church of the Jesuits in Havana in Centro Habana (neighborhood of Center Havana). In 1971, he graduated from the University of Havana and a few years later joined the Society of Jesus. He studied at San Basilo Magno Seminary in Santiago de Cuba and later at the San Carlos and San Ambrosio Seminary. In 1989, before ending his studies in theology he was sent to the Instituto de Teologia San Inacio (St. Ignatius Institute of Theology) in Belo Horizonte, Brazil. It is there that he received his doctorate in theology.

He was ordained on July 3, 1990, in Havana. He then returned to Brazil to continue his studies and eventually began to teach at the Instituto de Teologia San Inacio. He returned to Cuba in May 2006 and became a professor at the San Carlos and San Ambrosio Seminary.

On December 13, 2006, the rector of the seminary, Jorge Enrique Serpa Pérez, was appointed Bishop of the Diocese of Pinar del Rio. In March 2007, Jaime Lucas Ortega y Alamino, Cardinal Archbishop of the Archdiocese of Havana, appointed Fr. Najarro as the Rector of the San Carlos and San Ambrosio Seminary.
