= 2023 in Cuba =

- Decades: 2000s; 2010s; 2020s
- See also: Other events of 2023; Timeline of Cuban history

This article covers events in the year 2023 in Cuba.

== Events ==
- 26 March – 2023 Cuban parliamentary election: Citizens in Cuba elect the members of the National Assembly.
- 19 April – 2023 Cuban presidential election Citizens in Cuba elect the President
- 5 September – The Cuban foreign ministry says they are aware of activities that sought to enlist Cuban citizens to fight on Russia's side in the Russo-Ukrainian War.

== Deaths ==
- 8 January – Arnie Coro, 80, Cuban radio presenter, co-founder of Radio Havana Cuba.
- 4 December – Juanita Castro, 90, activist.
