= Buscando a Casal =

2019 film

- Directed by: Jorge Luis Sánchez
- Starring: Yasmani Guerrero
- Release date: 7 December 2019 (Havana)
- Running time: 116 minutes
- Country: Cuba
- Language: Spanish

Buscando a Casal is a 2019 Cuban drama film directed by Jorge Luis Sánchez, based on the life of poet Julián del Casal. It was selected as Cuba's entry for the Best International Feature Film at the 93rd Academy Awards, but it was not nominated.

== Cast ==
- Yasmani Guerrero as Julián del Casal
- Yadier Fernández
- Blanca Rosa Blanco
- Armando Miguel Gómez
- Marlon López

== See also ==
- List of submissions to the 93rd Academy Awards for Best International Feature Film
- List of Cuban submissions for the Academy Award for Best International Feature Film
