= 2020 in Cuba =

- Decades: 2000s; 2010s; 2020s
- See also: Other events of 2020; Timeline of Cuban history

Events in the year 2020 in Cuba.

== Incumbents ==
- First Secretary of the Communist Party of Cuba: Raúl Castro
  - Second Secretary: José Ramón Machado Ventura
- President of the Council of State: Miguel Díaz-Canel
  - First Vice President: Salvador Valdés Mesa

== Events ==
- 11 March – The first three cases of COVID-19 in Cuba were confirmed, all of whom were Italian tourists.
- 16 March – The cruise ship MS Braemar, with over 1,000 passengers and crew on board, is given permission to berth in Cuba after being rejected by The Bahamas. At least five passengers tested positive for COVID-19. British citizens were able to take flights home after both governments reached an agreement on their repatriation.
- 30 July – The government announces economic reforms giving more freedom to private businesses.
- 27 August – The governor of Havana announces a curfew and travel ban to curb the spread of COVID-19.
- 1 September
  - Cuba establishes a curfew and other strict measures to deal with the spread of the virus.
  - U.S. President Donald Trump orders Marriott Hotels & Resorts to close its operations in Cuba.
- 14 September – With the addition of 12 health workers in Togo, Cuba has sent 4,000 health workers to 40 countries during the pandemic. Human Rights Watch and the government of the United States have complained because the workers involved have received only a small part of the money paid by the host countries; Cuba sees this as a type of tax to finance its universal health care. Cuba reports 4,684 cases and 108 deaths related to the virus.
- November – Hurricane Eta
- 10 December – President Miguel Diaz-Canel says Cuba will eliminate its dual exchange rate in January and have a fixed exchange rate of 24 pesos/US dollar. This is the first devaluation since 1959.

== Deaths ==
- 25 August – Pedro de Oraá, painter (b. 1931).
- 2 September – Paco Prats, 76, animation producer.
- 26 September – José Antonio Arbesú, 80, diplomat; cancer.
- 16 October – Tomás Herrera Martínez, 69, basketball player, Olympic bronze medallist (1972).
- 1 November Julio Bécquer, 88, baseball player (Washington Senators, Los Angeles Angels, Minnesota Twins).
- 3 November – Taymi Chappé, 52, Cuban-Spanish Olympic fencer (1996).
- 7 November – Cándido Camero, 99, jazz percussionist.
- 16 November – Dairon Blanco, 28, footballer (Las Tunas, national team); traffic collision.
- 18 November – Broselianda Hernández, 56, actress (The Companion); drowned.
- 24 November – Julio César Gandarilla Bermejo, 77, vice admiral, Minister of the Interior (since 2017).

== See also ==
- 2020 in the Caribbean
- COVID-19 pandemic in Cuba
- 2020 Atlantic hurricane season
- 2020 Cuban protests
