= Carlos Manuel de Céspedes y García-Menocal =

Cuban Roman Catholic priest, theologian, and writer

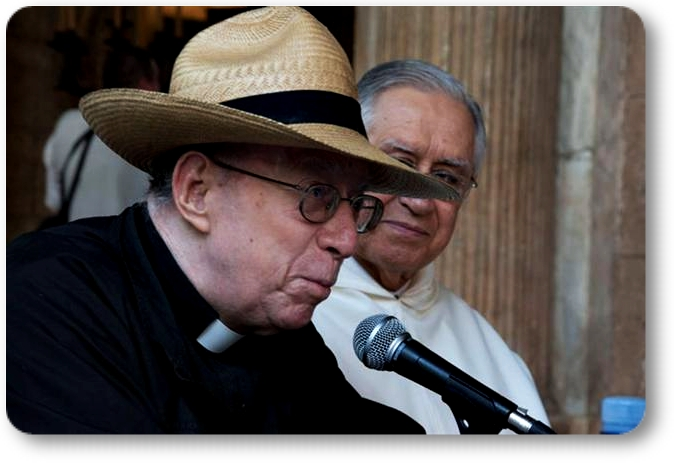
- Carlos Manuel de Céspedes in 2013
- Born: Carlos Manuel de Céspedes y García-Menocal; 16 July 1936; Havana, Cuba
- Died: 3 January 2014 (aged 77); Havana, Cuba
- Other name: Carlos Manuel de Céspedes
- Education: University of Havana
- Occupations: Priest, theologian, writer

Carlos Manuel de Céspedes y García-Menocal (16 July 1936 – 3 January 2014) was a Cuban Roman Catholic priest, theologian and writer.

== Biography ==
He was born in Havana on 16 July 1936. He earned degrees in law and philosophy at the University of Havana. He studied at the Pontifical Gregorian University from 1959 to 1961. He was ordained a priest in Rome on 23 December 1961. He became vicar general of the Archdiocese of Havana. He was the rector of Havana's Seminary of Saint Charles and Saint Ambrose from 1966 to 1970 and general secretary of the Conference of Catholic Bishops of Cuba from 1970 to 1991.

His writings include the novel Érase una vez en La Habana, published in Spain in 1998, a volume of short stories Zarpazos a la memoria in 2002, and a biography of Félix Varela Pasión por Cuba y por la Iglesia. He served on the editorial board, and contributed to, the Catholic magazine Palabra Nueva. In 2005 he was inducted into the Academia Cubana de la Lengua (Cuban Language Academy), the third churchman to receive the honor since its founding in 1926 and the first since the Cuban Revolution.

He died on the morning of 3 January 2014, aged 77, in his hometown of Havana.

He was the brother of Manuel Hilario de Céspedes y García Menocal, Bishop of Matanzas.
