= Juan de Dios Hernández-Ruiz =

Cuban Roman Catholic bishop (born 1948)

The Most Reverend Juan de Dios Hernández Ruiz S.J.
- Bishop of Pinar del Río
- Church: Roman Catholic Church
- Diocese: Pinar del Río
- See: Pinar del Río
- Appointed: 5 June 2019
- Installed: 13 July 2019
- Predecessor: Jorge Enrique Serpa Pérez
- Other post: Secretary General of the Cuban Episcopal Conference (2013-)
- Previous posts: Titular Bishop of Passo Corese (2005-19); Auxiliary Bishop of La Habana (2005-19)

Orders
- Ordination: 26 December 1976
- Consecration: 14 January 2006 by Jaime Lucas Ortega y Alamino

Personal details
- Born: Juan de Dios Hernández Ruiz; 14 November 1948 (age 77) Holguín, Cuba
- Education: Pontifical Gregorian University
- Motto: Que él crezca

Juan de Dios Hernández-Ruiz, S.J. (born November 14, 1948, in Holguín, Cuba) is a Cuban Roman Catholic bishop, currently serving as the Bishop of Pinar del Río since his appointment by Pope Francis on June 5, 2019. He previously served as the Titular Bishop of Passo Corese and Auxiliary Bishop of the Archdiocese of Havana.

He studied at the Seminary of Santiago de Cuba. He was then transferred to the Seminario Mayor Interdiocesano de San Cristóbal de La Habana, where he studied philosophy and theology. He continued his studies in Rome at the Pontifical Gregorian University. In 1974 entered the Society of Jesus. He was ordained a Jesuit priest on December 26, 1976. From 1980 to 1986 he was assigned as a priest to in Santiago de Cuba and Cienfuegos. He again went to Rome for more studies and returned to Cuba assigned to the Archdiocese of Havana.

He was appointed Titular Bishop of Passo Corese and Auxiliary Bishop of the Archdiocese of Havana on December 3, 2005, and was consecrated a bishop on January 14, 2006, at the Cathedral of Havana by Jaime Lucas Ortega y Alamino, Cardinal Archbishop of Havana assisted by Mons. Emilio Aranguren-Echevarria, Bishop of Diocese of Holguín and Mons. Hector Luis Lucas Pena-Gomez Bishop Emeritus of Holguín.
