= Manuel Hilario de Céspedes y García Menocal =

Cuban Roman Catholic bishop (1944–2025)

- Bishop Emeritus of Matanzas
- Appointed: 7 May 2005
- Installed: 11 June 2005
- Term ended: 22 March 2022
- Predecessor: Mariano Vivanco Valiente
- Successor: Juan Gabriel Díaz Ruiz

Orders
- Ordination: 21 May 1972
- Consecration: 4 June 2005 by José Siro González Bacallao

Personal details
- Born: 11 March 1944 Havana, Cuba
- Died: 26 March 2025 (aged 81)

Manuel Hilario de Céspedes y García Menocal (11 March 1944 – 26 March 2025) was a Cuban Roman Catholic prelate, who served as the bishop of the Diocese of Matanzas from 2005 to 2022. He studied for the priesthood in Venezuela and filled pastoral assignments there for twelve years before returning to his native Cuba, where he worked in the Diocese of Pinar del Rio until being appointed bishop.

== Biography ==
De Céspedes was born in Havana, Cuba, on 11 March 1944. He was the great-great-grandson of Carlos Manuel de Céspedes, the first president of Cuba, and the grandnephew of Mario García Menocal, the third. The Catholic writer and vicar general of the Archdiocese of Havana, Carlos Manuel de Céspedes y García-Menocal, was his brother.

He did his primary and secondary studies with the Marist Brothers at La Vibora, a suburb of Havana and then immigrated to Puerto Rico where he received a doctorate in electrical engineering. In 1966, he entered the seminary for adult vocations in Caracas, Venezuela. He was ordained a priest for the Diocese of Pinar del Rio on 21 May 1972. He spent twelve years in the Archdiocese of Caracas and in 1984 returned to the Diocese of Pinar del Rio in Cuba. He worked as a parish priest there until 2002, when he became chancellor of the diocesan curia and then vicar general. He was also the assessor of the diocesan commission for culture and of the Catholic Center for Civic and religious training.

He was appointed Bishop of Matanzas on 7 May 2005 and received his episcopal consecration on 4 June in the cathedral in Pinar del Rio from José Siro González Bacallao, Bishop of the Pinar del Rio, assisted by Cardinal Jaime Lucas Ortega y Alamino, Archbishop of Havana and Pedro Meurice Estíu, Archbishop of Santiago de Cuba.

Pope Francis accepted his resignation on 22 March 2022. He died on 26 March 2025, at the age of 81.

Catholic Church titles
Preceded by Mariano Vivanco Valiente	Bishop of Matanzas; 2005–2022	Succeeded by Juan Gabriel Díaz Ruiz
