= 2024 in Cuba =

- Decades: 2000s; 2010s; 2020s
- See also: Other events of 2024; Timeline of Cuban history

This article covers events in the year 2024 in Cuba.

== Incumbents ==
- First Secretary of the Communist Party of Cuba: Miguel Díaz-Canel
- President of Cuba: Miguel Díaz-Canel
  - Vice President of Cuba: Salvador Valdés Mesa
- Prime Minister of Cuba: Manuel Marrero Cruz

== Events ==
=== February ===
- February 2 – Economy minister and concurrent deputy prime minister Alejandro Gil Fernández is dismissed by First Secretary Miguel Díaz-Canel amid an ongoing economic crisis. Díaz-Canel subsequently announces a criminal investigation against Gil for unspecified offenses.
- February 14 – Cuba and South Korea establish diplomatic relations after exchanging letters via their United Nations representatives.

=== March ===
- March 17 – 2024 Cuban protests: Hundreds of protestors in several cities demonstrate against food shortages, electricity outages and political repression.
- May 15 – The United States removes Cuba from its list of countries deemed less than fully cooperative against violent groups.

=== October ===
- October 18 – 2024 Cuba blackout: The entire national power grid affecting more than 10 million citizens fails after the Antonio Guiteras thermoelectric plant collapses.
- October 20 – Hurricane Oscar makes landfall near Baracoa, killing at least seven people.

=== November ===
- November 6 – Hurricane Rafael makes landfall near Playa Majana, Artemisa Province, causing a nationwide blackout.
- November 10 – A magnitude 6.8 earthquake hits near Bartolomé Masó, causing shaking across the east of the country.

=== December ===
- December 4 – 2024 Cuba blackout: The entire national power grid affecting more than 10 million citizens fails after the Antonio Guiteras thermoelectric plant collapses again.
- December 30 – Raul Ernesto Cruz, a Salvadoran national convicted for his role in the 1997 Cuba hotel bombings, is released after serving a 30-year prison sentence.

== Art and entertainment ==
- List of Cuban submissions for the Academy Award for Best International Feature Film

== Holidays ==
- January 1 – Liberation Day
- January 2 – Victoria Day
- March 29 – Good Friday
- May 1 – Labour Day
- July 25–27 – Day of the National Rebellion
- October 10 – Independence Day
- December 25 – Christmas Day

== Deaths ==
- January 1 – Marcia Garbey, 74, Olympic long jumper (1968, 1972).
- January 2 – Osvaldo Lara, 68, Olympic sprinter (1980).
- January 22 – Maricet Espinosa, 34, Olympic judoka (2016).
- July 22 – Lucía Chacón Hechavarría, 112, supercentenarian.

== See also ==
- 2020s
- 2024 Atlantic hurricane season
- 2024 in the Caribbean
