= Dagoberto Planos Despaigne =

Cuban singer (1956–2021)

Dagoberto Planos Despaigne (June 1956 – 3 March 2021) was a Cuban singer. He was one of the leading vocalists of the Karachi orchestra. He died from cirrhosis.
