= Agustín Drake Aldama =

Cuban metal sculptor (1934–2022)

Agustín Drake Aldama (1 September 1934 – 4 August 2022) was a Cuban metal sculptor.

Born in Matanzas, he graduated at the Escuela Provincial de Artes Plásticas Alberto Tarascó, Matanzas, Cuba in 1953 and years later he was a director of this school between 1963 and 1968. He developed different art forms like drawing, painting, sculpture and graphic design.

== Individual exhibitions ==
Drake made various exhibitions, among them we can quote Exposición de Esculturas de Agustín Drake at Liceo de Matanzas, Matanzas, Cuba in 1959; Sculpture sur la Faune Fantastique at Anasy Antananarivo, Madagascar and Fauna fantástica. Esculturas de Agustín Drake at Salao Internacional do Departamento Nacional de Museus e Monumentos, Luanda, Angola and Museu Nacional de Arte, Maputo, Mozambique, both in 1981.

== Collective exhibitions ==
Drake also formed part of many collective exhibitions: for example at Museo Nacional de Bellas Artes, La Habana he shows his work in 1954, 1955, 1956, 1959 and 1964 in different exhibitions. Also, he formed part of other shows at Centro de Arte Internacional, La Habana, Cuba in 1980; at Museo de Arte Moderno "La Tertulia", Cali, Colombia in 1976; at Centro D'Arte "Il Meloziano", Genoa, Italy in 1989, etc.

== Awards ==
During his life he obtained different recognitions like Prize at V Salón Provincial de Artes Plásticas, Galería de Arte, Matanzas in 1983 and Sculpture Prize at VIII Salón Provincial "El Arte es un Arma de la Revolución" in Galería de Arte, Matanzas, Cuba at 1986.

== Collections ==
Drake's work can be found in collections such as Museo de la Escultura, Las Tunas, Cuba, and Oficina de Asuntos Históricos, State Council, Havana, Cuba.
