= Matanzas Cathedral =

Catholic church in Matanzas, Cuba

Coordinates: 23°03′N 81°35′W

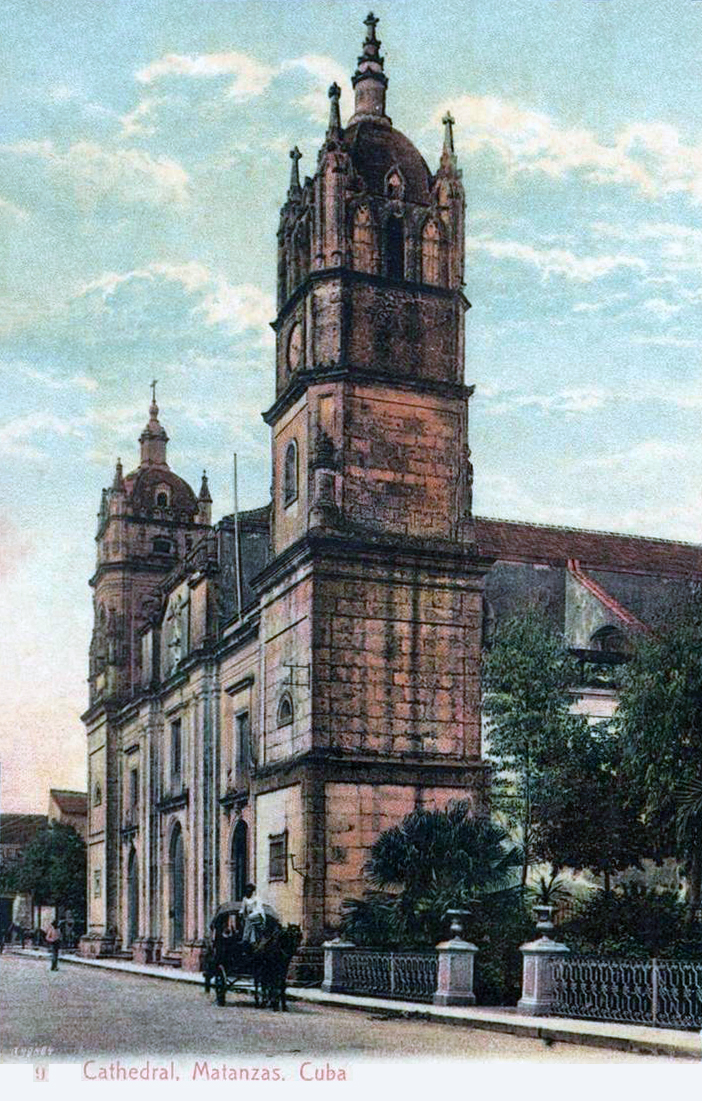
San Carlos Cathedral of Matanzas, in a postcard of 1908.

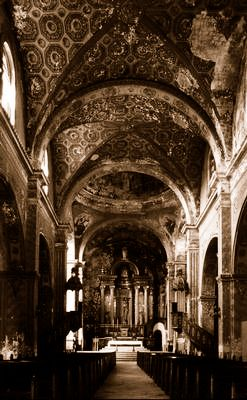
The interior of the San Carlos Cathedral of Matanzas in 1926.

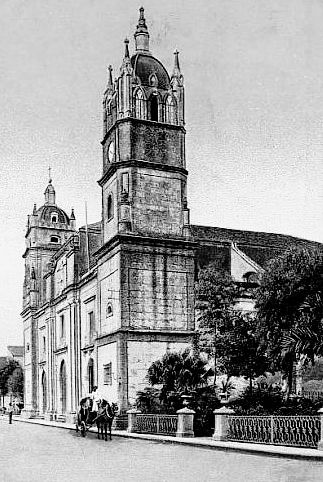
Cathedral of Matanzas in a photo of 1906.

The Cathedral of San Carlos Borromeo (Spanish: Catedral de San Carlos Borromeo) is a Catholic church in Matanzas, Cuba. It is the seat of Manuel Hilario de Céspedes y García Menocal, the Bishop of the Roman Catholic Diocese of Matanzas.

== History ==
The foundation stone of the church was laid on 12 October, 1693, and the first Mass was celebrated by the Bishop of Santiago, Diego Evelino Hurtado de Compostela. The original church was a simple structure constructed of fronds of the royal palm. It was soon destroyed in a storm and construction commenced on the present church. The building was finished in 1735 with all its facilities were in use by 1750. It is a beautiful and elegant church with frescoes on the walls, ceilings and in the big dome. After years of neglect due to poor funding, the cathedral was carefully restored in 2017.

== Location ==
The cathedral is in the neighborhood of Matanzas; the section of the city between the two rivers, the Yumuri and San Juan. A half block from the Parque de la Libertad (Freedom Park) and the Palacio Provincial (Provincial Palace). It is located on calle Jovellanos (Jovellanos Street), between Milanes and Independence streets.

== Gallery ==
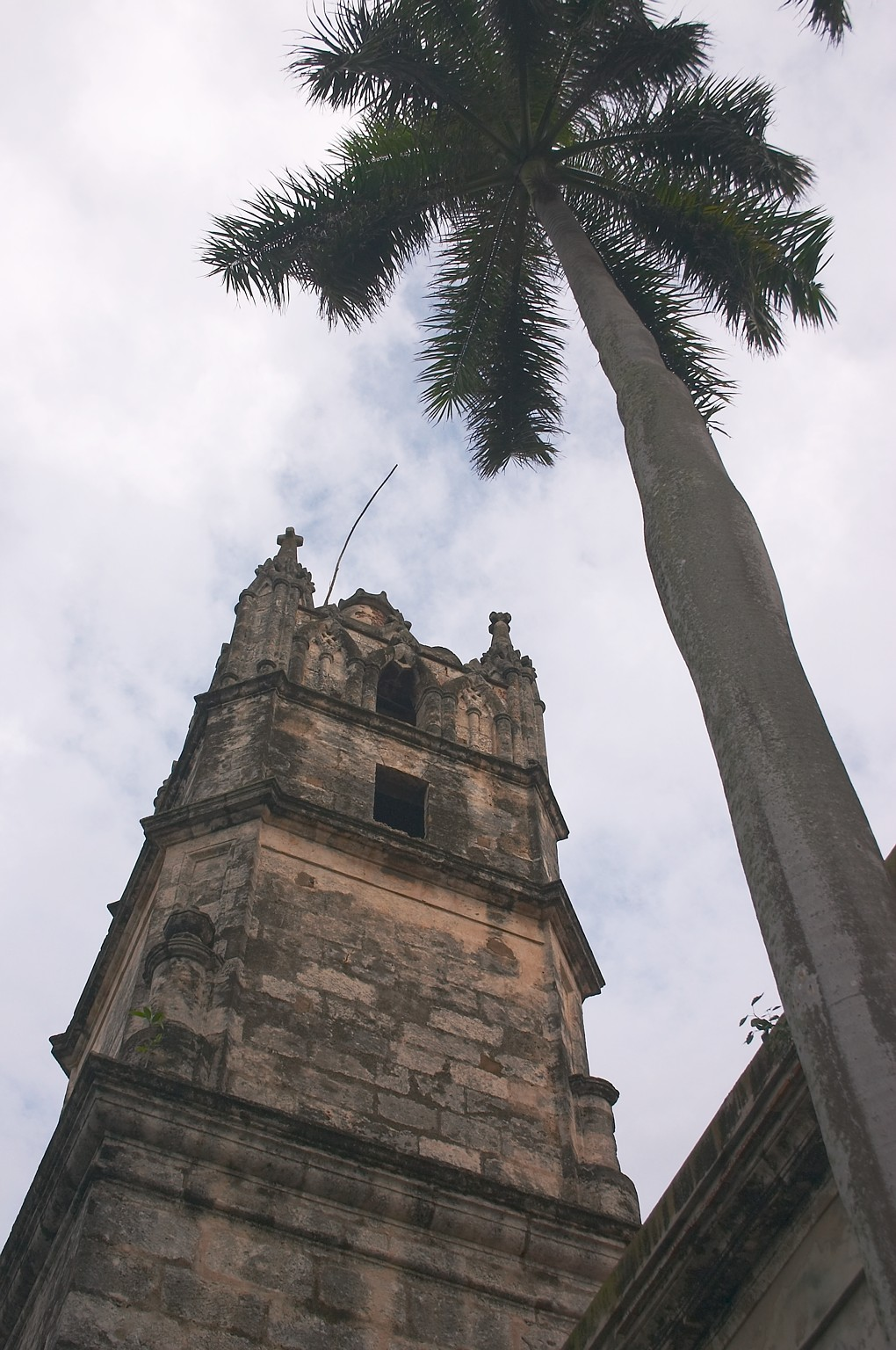
Matanzas Cathedral's North Tower

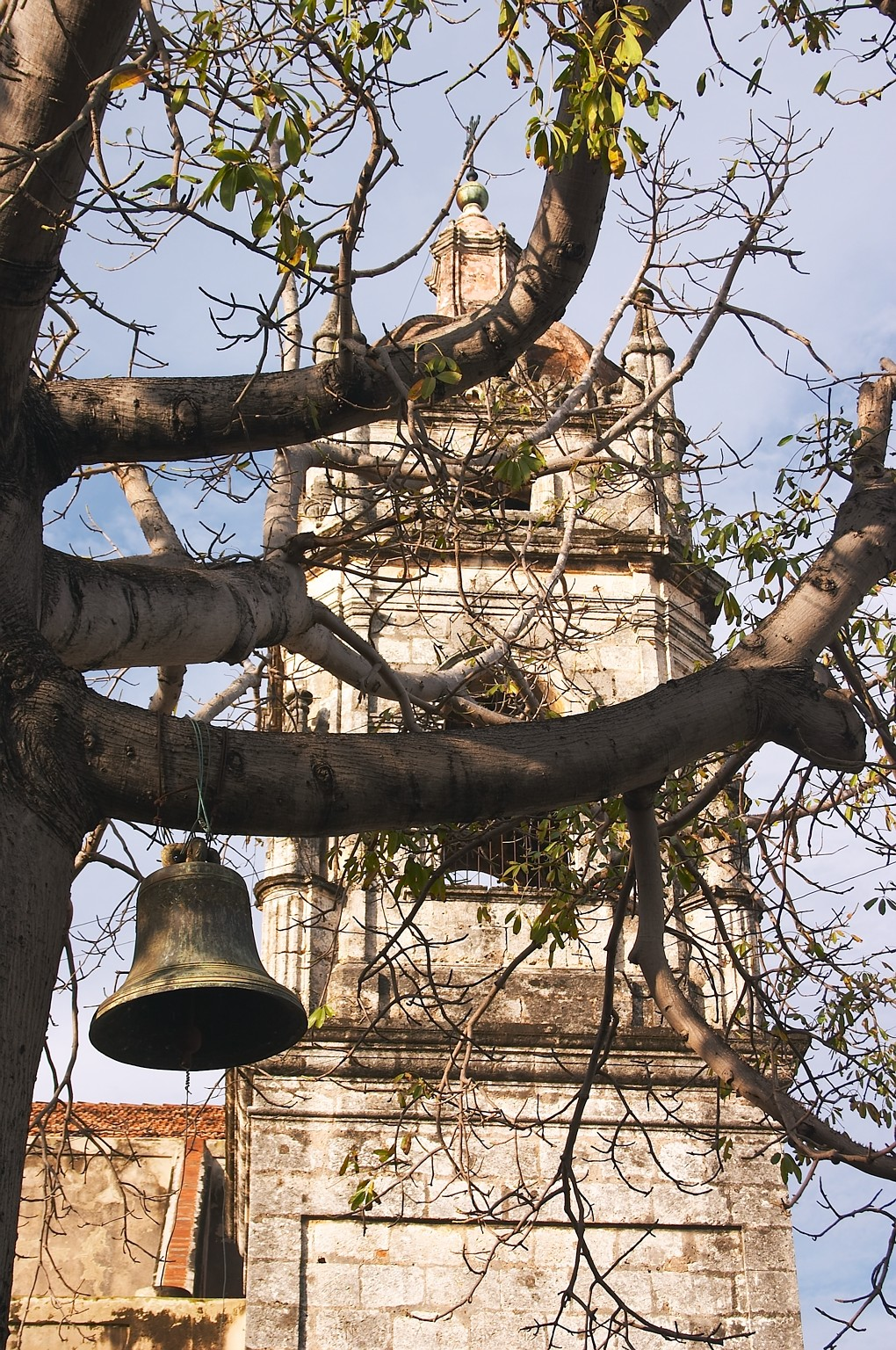
South Tower

== See also ==
- Religion in Cuba
