= Miriam Learra =

Cuban actress (1936–2025)

- Born: November 19, 1936; Havana, Cuba
- Died: October 25, 2025 (aged 88); Havana, Cuba
- Occupation: Actress
- Years active: 1972–2020

Miriam Obdulia Learra Roig (November 19, 1936 – October 25, 2025) was a Cuban film, television and theatre actress.

== Life and career ==
Learra became involved in acting in 1962, joining a workshop led by Julio Matos. In 1963, she was selected to study acting and directing at the DAMU center in Prague, where she remained until graduating in 1966. Since then, she has had an extensive and successful acting career, giving preference to the theater.

Between 1977 and 1980, she taught at the National School of Arts; from 1982 to 1984, she was president of the Theater Section of the Performing Arts Association of the National Union of Writers and Artists of Cuba (UNEAC), and from 1993 to 1995, she was general director of the Teatro Estudio Group.

Learra died in Havana on October 25, 2025, at the age of 88.

== Filmography ==
=== Film ===
Year	Title	Role
1972	Un Día de Noviembre	
1977	The Teacher	
1979	Aquella larga noche	
1996	Lejos de África	Mother at school
1998	Mambí	Leonor
2003	The Galíndez File	Rosa
2011	7 Days in Havana	

=== Television ===
Year	Title	Role	Notes
1986–87	Hoy es siempre todavía	Berta	TV series
1987	La séptima familia	Josefa	TV series
1990	Las Honradas		TV series
1995	El año que viene	Evangelina	TV series
1996	Entre mamparas	Doña Maria	TV series
1997	Tierra brava	Silvia Casamayor	TV series
2020	VOM	Verónica	1 episode of TV series
