= Conch Key, Florida =

- Unincorporated community
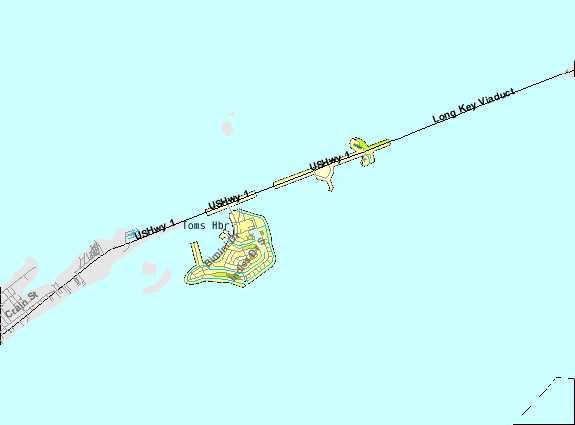
- U.S. Census Bureau map of Duck Key CDP showing boundaries which include Conch Key

- Location within Florida Location within the United States
- Coordinates: 24.789°N 80.889°W
- Country: United States
- State: Florida
- County: Monroe
- Elevation: 3.3 ft (1 m)
- Time zone: UTC-5 (Eastern (EST))
  - Summer (DST): UTC-4 (EDT)

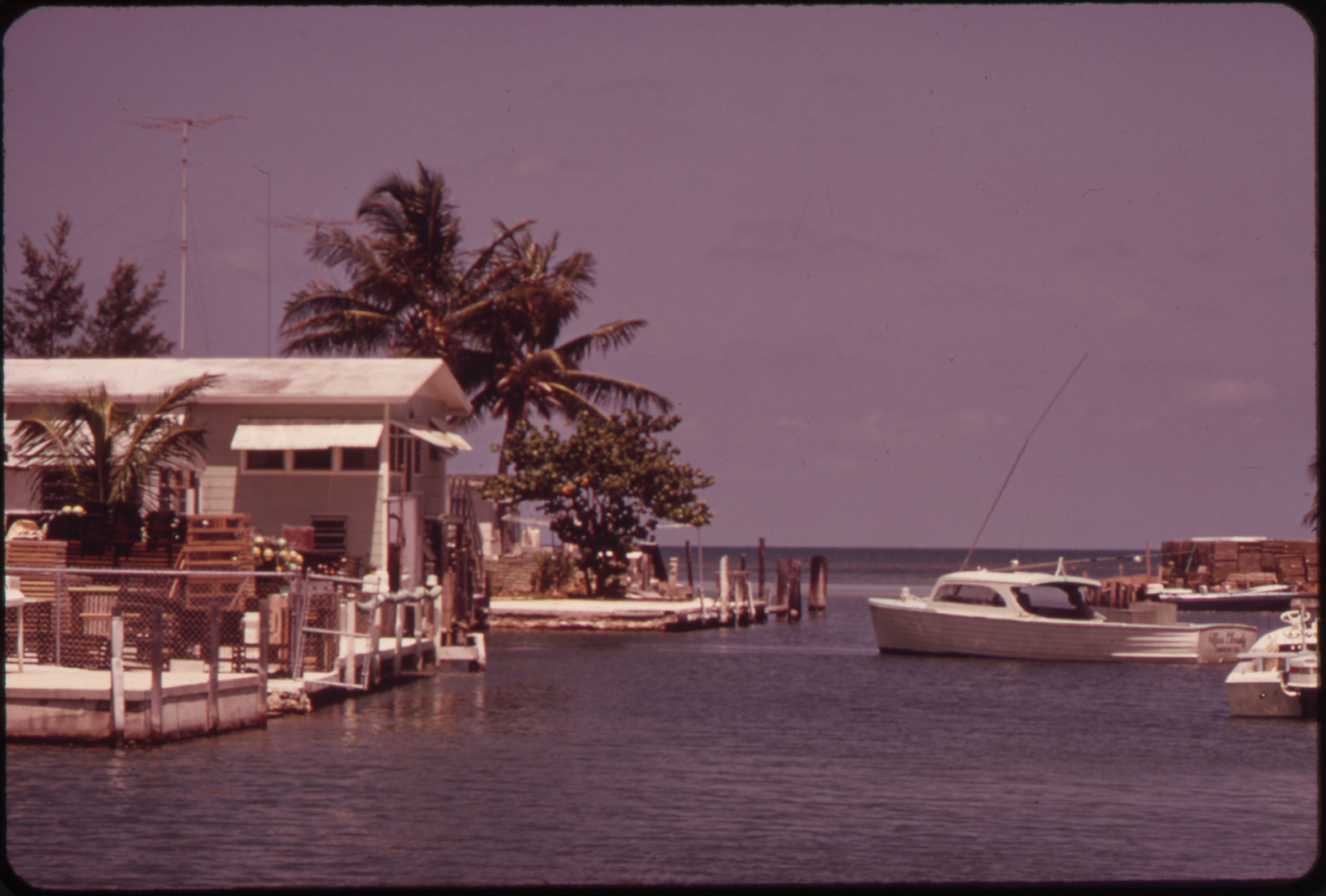
Conch Key, Florida (1973)

Conch Key is an island and unincorporated community in Monroe County, Florida, United States, located in the middle Florida Keys. U.S. 1 (the Overseas Highway) crosses the key at approximately mile markers 62–63, between Long and Duck Keys. It is part of the census-designated place of Duck Key.

Little Conch Key, near mile marker 62.2, is also known as Walker's Island.

== Geography ==
It is located at 24.789666°N 80.889437°W, its elevation 3 feet (1 m).

== Education ==
It is in the Monroe County School District. It is zoned to Stanley Switick Elementary School (K-8) in Marathon.
