= José Siro González Bacallao =

Cuban Roman Catholic priest (1930–2021)

- Bishop of Pinar del Río
- Church: Catholic Church
- Diocese: Diocese of Pinar del Río
- In office: 30 March 1982 – 13 December 2006
- Predecessor: Jaime Lucas Ortega y Alamino
- Successor: Jorge Enrique Serpa Pérez

Orders
- Ordination: 28 February 1954
- Consecration: 16 May 1982 by Jaime Lucas Ortega y Alamino

Personal details
- Born: 9 December 1930 Candelaria, Pinar del Río Province, Cuba
- Died: 19 July 2021 (aged 90) Mantua, Pinar del Río Province, Cuba

José Siro González Bacallao (9 December 1930 – 19 July 2021) was a Cuban Roman Catholic priest and prelate. He served as the Bishop of the Roman Catholic Diocese of Pinar del Río, based in the city of Pinar del Río, from 1982 until 2006. He remained bishop emeritus until his death in 2021.

González was born to a poor family on 9 December 1930, in the town of Candelaria, Pinar del Río Province (now located in present-day Artemisa Province since 2011). He enrolled in San Carlos y San Ambrosio seminary in Havana when he was just 12-years old to become a diocesan priest. He spent one year (1944–1945) at San Carlos y San Ambrosio before transferring to Seminario El Buen Pastor (Good Shephard Seminary), where he completed his training. He was ordained as a Catholic priest on 28 February 1945. He celebrated his first mass on 7 March 1945, in Candelaria.

He was appointed pastor of the San Juan y Martínez parish in 1957, where he served for a total of twenty-two years, including the period after the Cuban Revolution. With the ensuing crackdown on the Catholic Church by the new communist government, González was tasked by Evelio Díaz-Cía, the then-Archbishop of the Archdiocese of Havana, with ministering to the remaining parishes in the eastern and central areas of the archdiocese. Beginning in 1966, González spent seven years as a Catholic priest in rural areas. He planted tobacco, beans, tubers, and rice in the new collective farms.

Pinar del Rio Bishop Jaime Ortega Alamino appointed him as vicar of the diocesan cathedral in 1979. He remained vicar until Pope John Paul II appointed him as Bishop of Pinar del Rio on 16 May 1982. Under Bishop González, the diocese constructed the Diocesan House Our Lady of Loreto and opened the Summer Schools for Catechists, the César Balbín Missionary Center in Candelaria, and a summer school for catechists. He also expanded the role of nuns and female religious orders for pastoral services in the Diocese of Pinar del Rio.

Bacallao announced his resignation and retirement in November 2006 at the age of 77. He retired to the town of Mantua, Cuba, where he lived for the rest of his life. González Bacallao died on 19 July 2021, at the age of 90. His funeral was held at the Cathedral of Pinar del Río with burial in the Pantheon of the Bishops of the Catholic Cemetery (el Panteón de los Obispos del Cementerio Católico de la Alameda) in Pinar del Río.
