= Melones Dam (Cuba) =

Dam in Cuba

- Location within Cuba
- Official name: Presa Melones
- Country: Cuba
- Location: Mayarí, Holguín Province
- Coordinates: 20°35′55.79″N 75°39′49.53″W
- Purpose: Water supply
- Status: Operational
- Construction began: Early 1980s
- Opening date: 2011; 15 years ago

Dam and spillways
- Type of dam: Embankment, concrete-face rock-fill
- Impounds: Mayarí River
- Height: 86 m (282 ft)
- Length: 507 m (1,663 ft)

Reservoir
- Total capacity: 630,000,000 m^{3} (510,000 acre⋅ft)
- Normal elevation: 85 m (279 ft)

The Melones Dam, also known as the Mayarí Dam, is a concrete-face rock-fill dam on the Mayarí River about 7 km (4.3 mi) south of Mayarí in Holguín Province, Cuba. It is the tallest dam in the country and the center-piece of the East–West Transvase System.

== Overview ==
The system aims to connect various watersheds in the water-rich Holguín Province to cities and towns within the province and to the drier Las Tunas and Camagüey Provinces to the west. The project is still under construction but when complete it will comprise six reservoirs and hundreds of miles of canals and pipes. Its 630,000,000 m^{3} (510,000 acre⋅ft) reservoir will help supply much of the water. Within the system, it will connect to the Sabanilla Reservoir to the west and the Levisa Reservoir to the east.

== History ==
The project originally began in the 1980s but stalled due to economic problems. It since restarted in 2005 under the supervision of the Cuban Revolutionary Armed Forces. The first phase was complete in 2009 and the Melones Dam was finished in 2011.
