= El Benny =

- Promotional poster
- Directed by: Jorge Luis Sánchez
- Written by: Abrahán Rodríguez; Jorge Luis Sánchez
- Produced by: Iohamil Navarro
- Starring: Renny Arozarena; Mario Guerra; Limara Meneses; Enrique Molina; Carlos Ever Fonseca; Cheryl Zaldivar
- Cinematography: José Manuel Riera
- Edited by: Manuel Iglesias
- Music by: Juan Manuel Ceruto
- Release date: July 2006 (Cuba)
- Country: Cuba
- Language: Spanish

El Benny is a Cuban film released in 2006, directed and co-written by Jorge Luis Sánchez, his first feature-length film. It is a fictional story based on the life of the famous Cuban musician Benny Moré. The film includes new versions of his songs, performed by musicians including Chucho Valdés, Juan Formell, Haila and Orishas.

The film premiered in Cuba in July 2006, and was presented at the Locarno International Film Festival in August 2006, where its star, Renny Arozarena, won the Boccalino prize for best performance for protagonist in all sections of festival. The film was Cuba's candidate for the Academy Awards. The film won the "First Work" (Opera Prima) award at the New Latin American Cinema festival in Havana in December 2006. It received its official U.S. premiere at the "Palm Springs International Film Festival" on 6 January 2007, and its east coast premiere at the Miami International Film Festival in March 2007.

The director, Sánchez, is distantly related to Benny Moré.

== Cast ==
- Renny Arozarena: Benny Moré
- Juan Manuel Villy Carbonell: Benny Moré (singing voice)
- Enrique Molina: Olimpio
- Carlos Ever Fonseca: Angeluis
- Mario Guerra: Monchy
- Limara Meneses: Aida
- Isabel Santos: Maggie
- Salvador Wood: Grandfather
- Laura de la Uz: Irene
- Kike Quiñones: Pedrito
- Carlos Massola: León Arévalo
- Félix Pérez: Genaro (Benny's grandfather)
- Cheryl Zaldívar: Sofía
- Husmell Díaz: Arnulfo
- Serafín García Aguiar: Gutiérrez
- Marcela Morales: Natalia
- Rakel Adriana: Doñita
- Bárbara Hernández: Lydia (nurse)
- Jorge Ferdecaz: Olegario
- Ulyk Anello: Duany
- Mayra Mazorra: Benny's Mother
- Carlos Arévalo: Músico Mexicano

== See also ==
- List of Cuban films
- List of Cuban submissions for the Academy Award for Best International Feature Film
