= Festivals in Havana =

Havana, Cuba, is a host city to numerous events and festivals.

== Festivals and events ==
=== Havana International Jazz Festival ===
Many festivals held in Cuba revolve around the arts such as music, dance, art, and even film making. One such festival is the annual Havana Jazz Festival, founded by several Cuban jazz musicians, which includes Cuba's Bobby Carcasses Afro-Cuban jazz "Havana Jazz Festival." The first venue for this jazz concert was the Casa de La Cultura Plaza in downtown Havana, which is still home to many music and jam sessions that take place to this day.

=== The International Havana Ballet Festival ===
The International Havana Ballet Festival (Festival Internacional de Ballet de La Habana) is an event dedicated to the art of dance. Created in 1960 by a joint effort of the Ballet Nacional de Cuba, the Instituto Nacional de la Industria Turística and the cultural organizations of the government, the International Ballet Festival of Havana was added to the plans of massive diffusion of arts started after the Cuban Revolution on 1 January 1959. This Festival, which currently is held in alternate years, is one of the oldest worldwide, and meets at different venues in the Cuban capital and in other cities. The event is non-competitive and its objective is the fraternal meeting of artists and other specialists. The International Ballet Festival of Havana attracts prestigious dancers from around the world, who perform along with artists from the country's own National Ballet of Cuba. The first ever International Ballet Festival of Havana was held in 1960 and became a biannual event from 1974. To this day, the event continues to be one of the most prominent ballet festivals in Cuba and attracts audiences from all over.

=== Havana's International Film Festival ===
The Havana's International Film Festival or (The International Festival of New Latin American Cinema) was founded on 3 December 1979 as a way to pay tribute to Spanish-language film makers. As a tradition, the festival takes place every December in the city. The event organizes several contests in categories such as fiction medium- and short-length films, first-timers, documentary, animation, scripts and posters, though the major attraction of the whole event is the Official Section Contest, in which some 21 feature films compete for the Coral Award. The festival has been the starting place for many now mainstream films includings the critically acclaimed movie City of God, which was Brazil's official film submission for the festival in 2002.

=== Habanos Cigar Festival ===
Every year Havana plays host to the Habanos Cuban Cigar Festival in the month of February. The festival is usually held over five days, with activities including: tours of cigar factories, a trade fair, various seminars focused on the production, distribution and history of Havanos cigars, cigar tastings, Habanosommelier contest, an instruction class on how to roll a Habano, and visits to tobacco plantations. Attendees of this event include distributors, “La Casa del Habano” managers from all over the world, production and sales executives, producers and marketers of luxury and smoker products, tobacco producers, dealers of the tobacco industry, artisans and collectors, smoker clubs, and amateur smokers.

=== Others ===
- Love in Festival (every year with a different social theme)
- The Havana International Book Fair
- International Percussion Festival
- Cuba Pista Cycling Cup
- May Theatre
- Havana International Guitar Festival and Competition
- International Ernest Hemingway White Marlin Fishing Tournament
- International Boleros de Oro Festival
- The Havana Carnival
- The Festival of Caribbean Culture
- The Havana International Theatre Festival
- The Havana Festival of Contemporary Music
- Havana International Festival of University Theatre
