= Gregorio Américo Pérez Valdés =

Cuban baseball player (1941–2021)

Free agent
- First baseman
- Born: 28 November 1941; Guayabal, Las Tunas Province, Cuba
- Died: 15 February 2021 (aged 79)

Gregorio Américo Pérez Valdés (28 November 1941 – 15 February 2021) was a Cuban baseball player, who served as a pitcher in the National Baseball Series, first with the Camagüey teams and later with Las Tunas, he was also known as Black Hand.

== Biography ==
Valdés was born on 28 November 1941 in the then town of Guayabal, now Amancio Rodríguez in Las Tunas, in the eastern region of Cuba.

He began playing on the town's grounds in the 1950s, and did it as an outfielder, until he did it as a pitcher in official events with the Loggers team.

He made his debut in the III National Series in 1964–1965 with the Farmers team, representing Camagüey, where he achieved the first results in Cuban baseball on 26 December 1965, during the V National Series, he launched the inaugural game of the Cándido González Stadium in Camagüey, held between the Industrial and Farmers teams, with a victory for the locals, five races by one.

From the beginning, he has presented credentials on the mound, relying on a speed close to 90 miles per hour, efficient breaking shipments in the lower zone and a luxury control, he joined the national team in 1970 at the Central American and Caribbean Games in Panama.

In the 1969–1970 season, during the IX National Baseball Series, he was the leader in games won with 12 victories. Since 1971, due to changes in the political and administrative structure of the country, he was a member of the teams from the eastern region; East, Miners, Coffee growers.

In 1972 he toured with a Cuban team in Panama and later on with one from the eastern zone to Mexico, playing in Mérida and Yucatán.

In 1974, at the opening of the baseball season, he threw a game against Farmers, where he only used 77 pitches. In 1975 he joined the Orientales team, winner of the title in the first Selective Series, under the direction of José “Pepín” Carrillo, in which the outfielders Osvaldo Calzada and Jorge Causillo also participated.

In the 1977–1978 series, the first after the new political-administrative division, he represented Las Tunas, reaching 100 games won.

He remained an active player until the 1980–1981 season. In the 16 National Series that he intervened, he achieved some of the best ERA averages with an average of 2.18 earned runs and 976 strikeouts delivered.

He died on 15 February 2021, at the age of 79 from prostate cancer.

== Career statistics ==
He officially retired in 1982, dedicating himself to the work of pitching coach, first at the Julio Antonio Mella Stadium and then at the José Octavio Bello González training center, in the capital of Tunis. He continues in this work until retirement in 1997, although he has not stopped collaborating with the development of the ball in the municipality and in the province. In 1998 he was a member of the delegation that accompanied the Cuban baseball team to the game against the Major League Baseball team, Baltimore Orioles, held in that American city. In 2005 he collaborated in sports in Venezuela for 19 months.
