= Bartolomé Masó, Cuba =

Bartolomé Masó
- Municipality
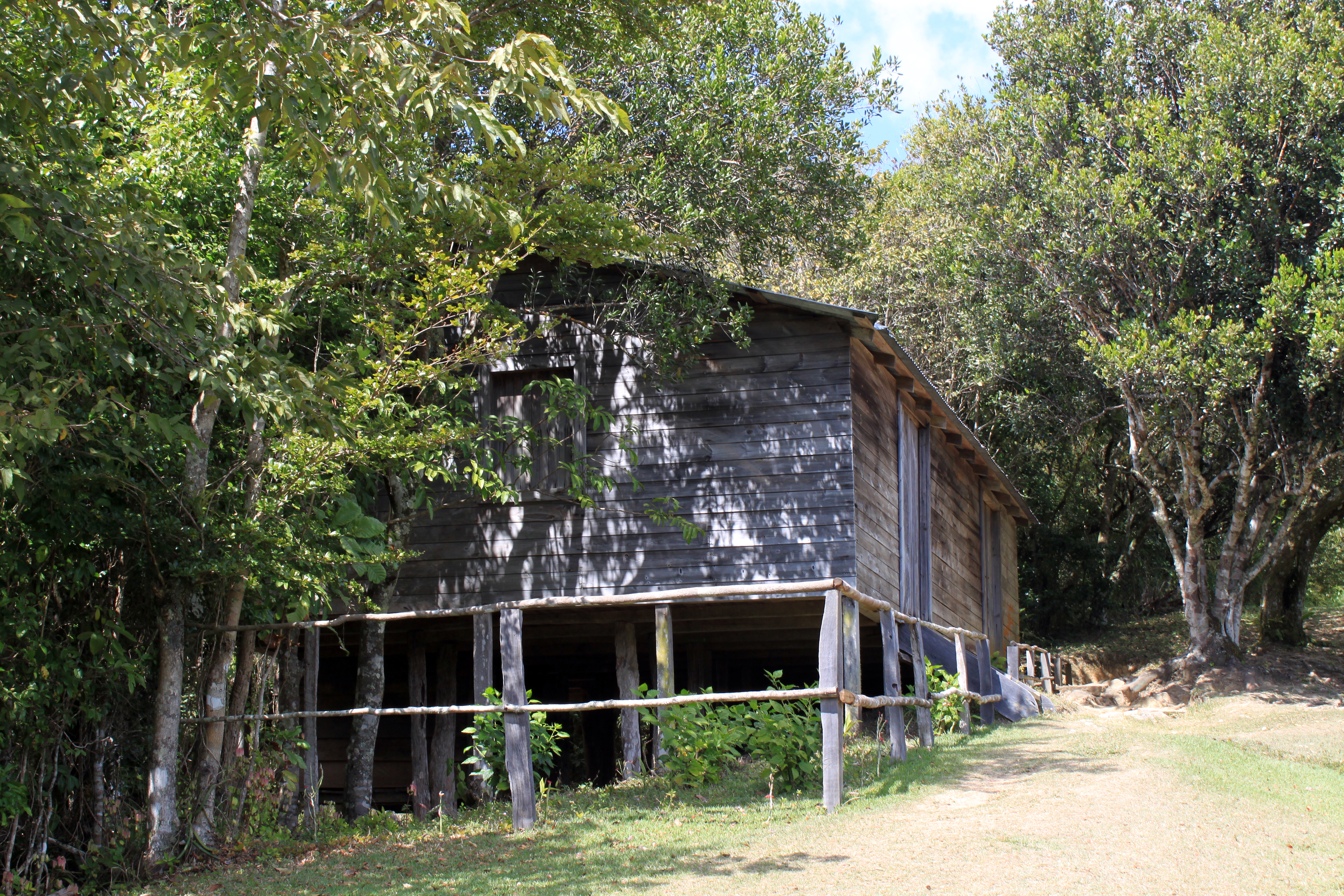
- View of the Comandancia General de La Plata

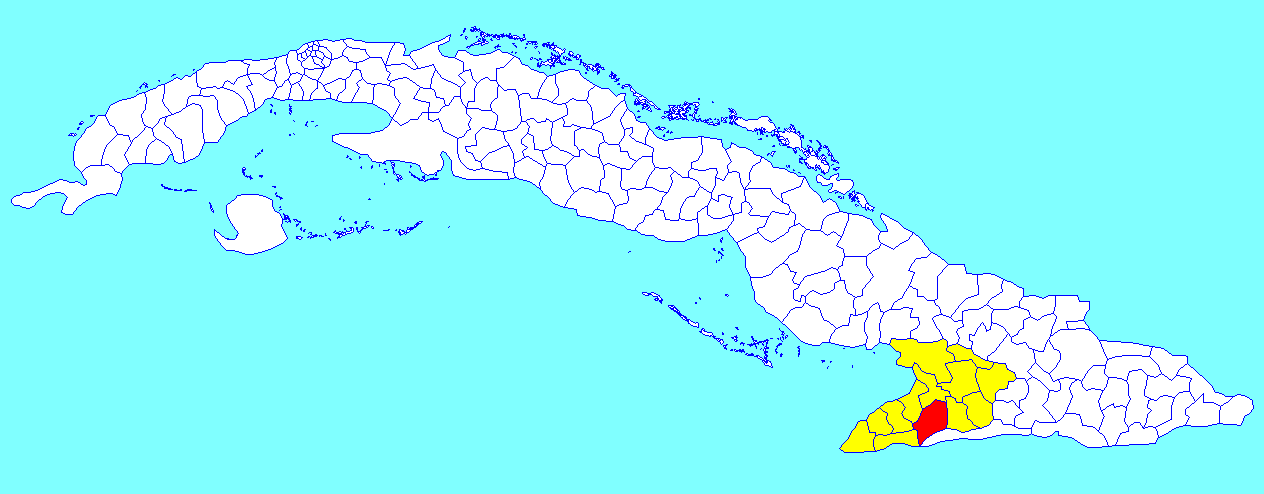
- Bartolomé Masó municipality (red) within Granma Province (yellow) and Cuba
- Coordinates: 20°10′7″N 76°56′34″W
- Country: Cuba
- Province: Granma

Government
  - President: Linne Martínez Sánchez

Area
  - Total: 629 km^{2} (243 sq mi)
- Elevation: 65 m (213 ft)

Population (2022)
  - Total: 46,711
  - Density: 74.3/km^{2} (192/sq mi)
- Time zone: UTC-5 (EST)
- Area code: +53-23
- Website: https://www.bartolomemaso.gob.cu/es/

Bartolomé Masó (Spanish pronunciation: [baɾtoloˈme maˈso]) is a municipality and town in the Granma Province of Cuba.

== Overview ==
The municipality was named after the Cuban patriot Bartolomé Masó Márquez. It is the home of the Comandancia General de La Plata, headquarters of the Cuban revolutionaries around Fidel Castro and today a museum, located in the Sierra Maestra mountains.

== Demographics ==
In 2022, the municipality of Bartolomé Masó had a population of 46,711. With a total area of 629 km^{2} (243 sq mi), it has a population density of 74/km^{2} (190/sq mi). In 2009, around 73% of Bartolomé Masó's territorial area of 634 square kilometers was rural and difficult to access.

== Earthquakes ==
On 10 November 2024, a 6.8 magnitude earthquake struck the coast of southeastern Cuba at UTC 05:00. The location of the earthquake was measured to be just about 40 miles away SSW of Bartolomé Masó. The earthquake's strength was felt along the coast of Cuba, which had already been experiencing flash flooding due to Hurricane Oscar, and major destruction. First Secretary of the Communist Party of Cuba Miguel Díaz-Canel Bermúdez said on X that the quakes damaged homes and powerlines and caused landslides in the coastal provinces of Santiago de Cuba and Granma. He urged people in those areas to stay outside in open spaces stating, "The first and most essential thing is to save lives."

The town was again hit by an earthquake with a magnitude of 3.3 in February 2025, with the epicenter being 24 kilometers from Bartolomé Masó.

== Climate ==
Bartolomé Masó has a tropical savanna climate (Köppen: Aw).

Climate data for Bartolome Maso
Month	Jan	Feb	Mar	Apr	May	Jun	Jul	Aug	Sep	Oct	Nov	Dec	Year
Mean daily maximum °C (°F)	28.8 (83.8)	29.8 (85.6)	30.3 (86.5)	31.1 (88.0)	31.1 (88.0)	31.6 (88.9)	32.5 (90.5)	32.5 (90.5)	31.9 (89.4)	30.8 (87.4)	29.9 (85.8)	29.3 (84.7)	30.8 (87.4)
Daily mean °C (°F)	23.7 (74.7)	24.4 (75.9)	24.9 (76.8)	26.0 (78.8)	26.5 (79.7)	27.1 (80.8)	27.6 (81.7)	27.6 (81.7)	27.2 (81.0)	26.4 (79.5)	25.2 (77.4)	24.4 (75.9)	25.9 (78.7)
Mean daily minimum °C (°F)	19.5 (67.1)	19.9 (67.8)	20.5 (68.9)	22.0 (71.6)	22.9 (73.2)	23.7 (74.7)	24.0 (75.2)	24.1 (75.4)	23.9 (75.0)	23.3 (73.9)	21.7 (71.1)	20.6 (69.1)	22.2 (71.9)
Average precipitation mm (inches)	9.0 (0.35)	8.1 (0.32)	12.6 (0.50)	24.9 (0.98)	66.4 (2.61)	76.0 (2.99)	83.6 (3.29)	93.5 (3.68)	86.4 (3.40)	74.2 (2.92)	28.3 (1.11)	14.0 (0.55)	577 (22.7)
Source: Weather.Directory

== See also ==
- Municipalities of Cuba
- List of cities in Cuba
