= Diocese of Matanzas =

Catholic diocese in Cuba

Coordinates: 23.0463°N 81.5771°W

Diocese of Matanzas Dioecesis Matansansis Catedral de San Carlos Borromeo
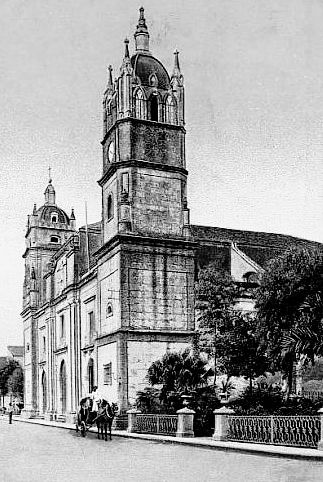
- Catedral San Carlos De Borromeo

Location
- Country: Cuba
- Ecclesiastical province: Province of San Cristóbal de la Habana
- Metropolitan: Matanzas

Statistics
- Area: 8,444 km^{2} (3,260 sq mi)
- Population: Total; Catholics: (as of 2004); 690,400; 478,000 (69.2%)
- Parishes: 37

Information
- Denomination: Catholic Church
- Sui iuris church: Latin Church
- Rite: Roman Rite
- Established: 10 December 1912 (113 years ago)
- Cathedral: Cathedral of St. Charles Borromeo

Current leadership
- Pope: Leo XIV
- Bishop: Juan Gabriel Díaz Ruiz

Map

The Diocese of Matanzas (Spanish: Diócesis Católica Romana de Matanzas) is a Latin Church ecclesiastic territory or diocese of the Catholic Church in Cuba. It is a suffragan diocese in the ecclesiastical province of the metropolitan Archdiocese of San Cristobal de la Habana. The diocese was erected 10 December 1912.

== Bishops ==
=== Ordinaries ===
- Charles Warren Currier (1913 - 1914)
- Severiano Sainz y Bencamo (1915 - 1937)
- Alberto Martín y Villaverde (1938 - 1960)
- José Maximino Eusebio Domínguez y Rodríguez (1961 - 1986)
- Mariano Vivanco Valiente (1987 - 2004)
- Manuel Hilario de Céspedes y García Menocal (2005 - 2022)
- Juan Gabriel Díaz Ruiz (since 2022)

=== Other priests of this diocese who became bishops ===
- Jaime Lucas Ortega y Alamino, appointed Bishop of Pinar del Rio in 1978; future Cardinal
- Agustín Alejo (Aleido) Román Rodríguez, appointed Auxiliary Bishop of Miami, Florida, USA in 1979
- Felipe de Jesús Estévez (priest here, 1970–1979), appointed Auxiliary Bishop of Miami, Florida, USA in 2003

== External links and references ==
- "Diocese of Matanzas". Catholic-Hierarchy.
- Conferencia De Obispos Catolicos De Cuba (Spanish)
