= Raul Santoserpa =

Cuban artist (1939–2025)

Raúl Santos Zerpa
- Raúl Santos Zerpa
- Born: Raúl Santoserpa; March 1939; Las Villas, Cuba
- Died: November 27, 2025 (aged 86)
- Education: Escuela Provincial de Artes Plásticas "Leopoldo Romañach", Santa Clara (Sculpture, 1960; Painting, 1960–1962)
- Known for: Painting, engraving, drawing
- Notable work: Rostros y Expresiones; Tributo a la danza
- Movement: Cuban modernism
- Awards: National Prize in Drawing, Salón Nacional de Artes Plásticas, Havana (1969); Acquisition Prize, Lalit Kala Akademy, Fourth Triennale India (1978); National Culture Award, Council of State, Republic of Cuba (1988); “Güije de Santa Clara” and “306th Anniversary of the Foundation of the City of Santa Clara” Diploma (1995)

Raul Santoserpa (March 1939 – November 27, 2025) was a Cuban painter and engraver.

== Background ==
In 1960, he graduated in Sculpture at the Escuela Provincial de Artes Plásticas "Leopoldo Romañach" Santa Clara, Las Villas, Cuba. Between 1960 and 1962, he studied Painting in the Escuela Provincial de Artes Plásticas "Leopoldo Romañach," Together with his artistic development he was professor of different art schools. From 1966, he was Member of the Unión de Escritores y Artistas de Cuba (UNEAC). He was also a juror in several fairs and contests.

Santoserpa died on November 27, 2025, at the age of 86.

== Individual exhibitions ==
In 1962, he presented Rostros y Expressiones. Dibujos de Raúl Santos Zerpa at the Círculo de Cultura, Santa Clara, Cuba. In 1971 he presented an exhibition at the (Gallery of the Union of Fine Artists), Warsaw, Poland. He was also in 1988 at the Galería de Arte, Trinidad, Cuba. In 1995, he did a solo show to celebrate the 306th anniversary of the foundation of the city, Casa de la Ciudad, Santa Clara, Villa Clara, Cuba.

== Collective exhibitions ==
His works have been presented in collectives shows too. In 1959, they were presented with the work of many other artists in Artes Plásticas. Operación Cultura, Universidad de La Habana, Havana, Cuba. In 1970, he was invited to the Inter-Grafik'70. Altes Museum, Berlin, Germany, in 1975 he was selected to conform the show Panorama del arte cubano de la colonia a nuestros días, Museo de Arte Moderno, Mexico City. Later in 1995, he was at the 1er. Salón de Arte Cubano Contemporáneo, Museo Nacional de Bellas Artes, Havana, Cuba. And in 1998, he did an exhibition with the name Tributo a la danza, Galería Habana, Havana, Cuba.

== Awards ==
He had obtained various prizes and recognitions during his life. Some of them are the National Prize in Drawing, Salón Nacional de Artes Plásticas, Centro de Arte Internacional, Havana, Cuba in 1969. In 1978, he gained the Acquisition Prize of the Lalit Kala Akademy, Fourth Triennale India. He was also awarded the National Culture Award, Council of State, Republic of Cuba in 1988. And in 1995, he received the "Güije de Santa Clara" y "306th Anniversary of the Foundation of the City of Santa Clara" Diploma, Granted for his outstanding artistic contribution, Villa Clara, Cuba.

== Collections ==
These are some of the institutions that collect his pieces: Consejo de Estado, República de Cuba, Cuba, Instituto de Arte Latinoamericano, Santiago de Chile, Chile, Lalit Kala Akademy, New Delhi, India, Museo de Arte Latinoamericano, León, Nicaragua, Museo Nacional de Bellas Artes, Havana, Cuba.
