= Braulio Orue-Vivanco =

Bishop Braulio Orue-Vivanco
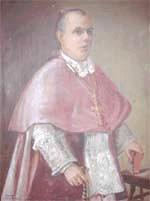
- Bishop Braulio Orue Vivanco
- Born: March 6, 1843; Havana, Cuba
- Died: October 21, 1904 (aged 61); Pinar del Río, Cuba

Braulio Orue-Vivanco (March 6, 1843 in Havana, Cuba – October 21, 1904 in Pinar del Río, Cuba) was the first Bishop of the Diocese of Pinar del Río.

His parents were Joaquin Orue-de las Casas and Josefa Vivanco. He studied at the Royal School of St. Ferdinand (Real Colegio de San Fernando) and at Colegio de Belén. He later studied at the San Carlos and San Ambrosio Seminary and at the University of Havana. He was ordained a priest in 1867. He served as a priest in various parishes.

On February 20, 1903, he was a priest at the parish of Santo Angel when he was elevated by Pope Leo XIII as the first Bishop of the new Diocese of Pinar del Río. He was consecrated at the Cathedral of Havana by Mons. Placide-Louis Chapelle, Archbishop of the Archdiocese of New Orleans and Apostolic Delegate of Cuba and Puerto Rico and assisted by Mons. Francisco de Paula Barnada-Aguilar, Archbishop of the Archdiocese of Santiago de Cuba.

He died October 21, 1904, and his funeral was held at the Cathedral of San Rosendo in Pinar del Río. His post was left vacant until 1907 when Manuel Ruiz-Rodriguez was made bishop.
