= Jorge Enrique Serpa Pérez =

Cuban Catholic bishop (1942–2026)

The Most Reverend Jorge Enrique Serpa Pérez
- Bishop Emeritus of Pinar del Río
- Church: Roman Catholic Church
- Archdiocese: San Cristóbal de la Habana
- Diocese: Pinar del Río
- Appointed: December 13, 2006
- Term ended: June 5, 2019
- Predecessor: José Siro González Bacallao
- Successor: Juan de Dios Hernández-Ruiz

Orders
- Ordination: July 14, 1968
- Consecration: January 13, 2007 by Jaime Lucas Ortega y Alamino, Pedro Rubiano Sáenz and José Siro González Bacallao
- Rank: Bishop

Personal details
- Born: March 16, 1942 Cienfuegos, Cuba
- Died: April 17, 2026 (aged 84) Havana, Cuba
- Denomination: Roman Catholic

Jorge Enrique Serpa Pérez (March 16, 1942 – April 17, 2026) was a Cuban Roman Catholic prelate, who served as a bishop of the Roman Catholic Diocese of Pinar del Rio.

== Biography ==
Serpa was born in Cienfuegos on March 16, 1942. When he was a child, his family moved to Havana. He studied at El Buen Pastor Seminary in Havana. In 1961, he went to study theology in Tournai, Belgium.

Serpa was ordained on July 14, 1968, in Belgium and assigned to the Archdiocese of Havana. From 1968 to 1999, the Cuban government would not allow him to return to Cuba and he was then translated to the Archdiocese of Bogotá in Colombia. He was allowed to return to Cuba in 1999. From 2003 to 2007, he was the rector of San Carlos and San Ambrosio Seminary.

He was appointed by Pope Benedict XVI on December 13, 2006, to be Bishop of Pinar del Rio. He was consecrated on January 13, 2007, at the cathedral in Havana by Cardinal Jaime Lucas Ortega y Alamino, Archbishop of Havana, assisted by Cardinal Pedro Rubiano Sáenz, Archbishop of Bogotá, and by Bishop José Siro González Bacallao of Pinar del Río. He took possession of his diocese the following day.

Serpa Perez died in Havana on April 17, 2026, at the age of 84.

Catholic Church titles
Preceded by José Siro González Bacallao	Bishop of Pinar del Río; 2006–2019	Succeeded by Juan de Dios Hernández Ruiz
