= Julián del Casal =

Cuban writer (1863–1893)

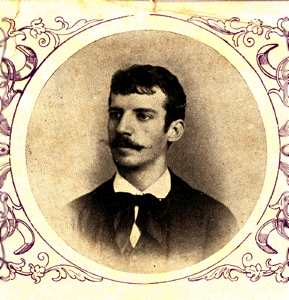
- Born: José Julián Herculano del Casal y de la Lastra; 7 November 1863; Havana, Captaincy General of Cuba
- Died: 21 October 1893 (aged 29); Havana, Captaincy General of Cuba
- Occupation: Poet
- Writing career
- Language: Spanish

José Julián Herculano del Casal y de la Lastra (7 November 1863 – 21 October 1893) was a poet from Havana, Cuba. He started his writing career at a young age and later in life was known as an important forebear of modernistic expression in Latin America.

He took his influence from the French poetic styles of the day and later, Rubén Darío and Modernismo.

== Early life ==
Casal was born in Havana, Cuba. The family of Julián del Casal was not wealthy, but they lived comfortably. His mother, a Cuban native named Maria del Carmen de la Lastra y Owens, died in 1868 when Casal was four years old. He was raised by his father, a Spaniard known as Julián del Casal y Ugareda, who died later in 1885 when Casal was twenty-two years old. Casal was born into a Catholic family and was baptized on 23 December at two months old, in La iglesia del Santo Angel Custodio, by his godparents Don José de la Lastra and Doña Matilde de la Lastra y Owens.

=== Education ===
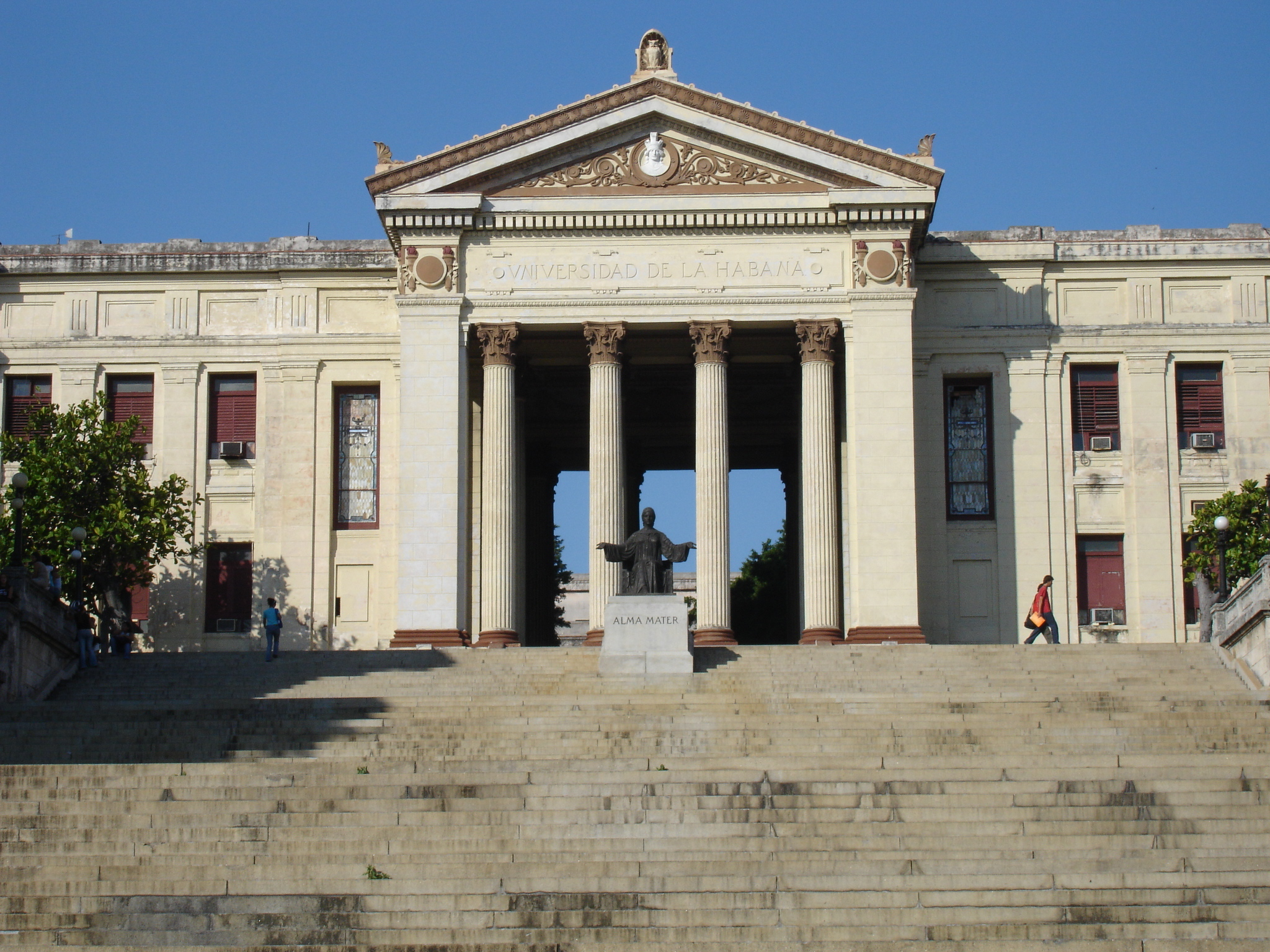
University of Havana in Havana, Cuba

In 1870, Julián del Casal began his education at a very formal school named El Real Colegio de Belén. He graduated with his bachelor's degree in 1880. After graduating from El Real Colegio de Belén he decided to enroll in the Havana University School of Law. He started in 1881 but was forced to drop out shortly after because of family financial difficulties. After he dropped out, he pursued his writing career and began working as a finance minister.

== Career ==
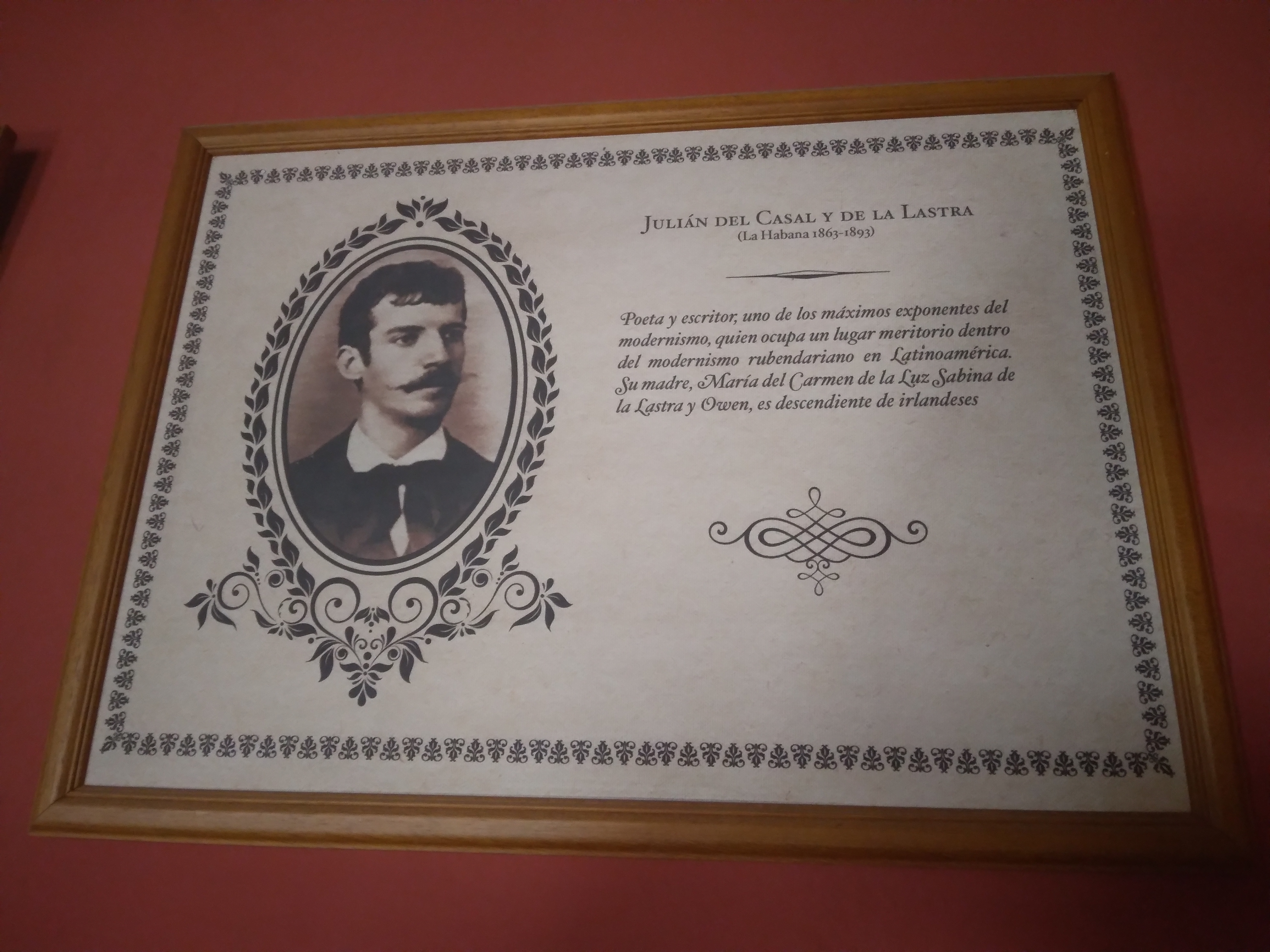
Plaque to del Casal on the wall of Café O'Reilly in Havana noting the Irish lineage of his mother

At the early age of fourteen, Casal began his own newspaper press with a fellow high school alumna, Arturo Mora. They titled their newspaper El Estudiante, periódico clandestino y manuscrito. After he graduated high school, he published his first work in a science, arts and literature weekly journal. Casal titled the poem El Ensayo and it was the first publication from a poet to be seen in a Cuban press. In this same year, he also began working as a clerk at El Ministerio de Hacienda (The Treasury Department). His writing career began to pick up when in 1885, Casal began publishing works in La Habana Elegante, a Cuban magazine that acted as a medium for the Modernist movement of that time. In 1888, he began working with El Figaro as well. Later that year, he traveled to Madrid, Spain. In 1889 Casal returned to his homeland of Cuba where he started to assist with meetings with the Galeria Literaria. In 1890 he published his first book which he named Hojas al Viento and helped to edit La Discusiónn The following year he started working with La Habana Literaria. His second book Nieve was published in 1892; the same year he met Ruben Dario and when Dario dedicated El Clavicordio de la Abuela to Casal. In 1893 he had a lot of contact with Dario including an article he wrote about Dario and a letter that Casal sent to Dario towards the end of his life.

== Later life ==
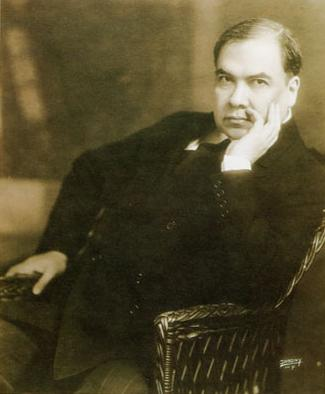
Casal's friend and colleague, Rubén Darío.

Julián del Casal continued publishing works up until his death in October 1893. Earlier that year, he wrote an article about his colleague Rubén Darío, the famous father of Modernism, in the Cuban magazine La Habana Elegante. Casal also began writing his final book Bustos y Rimas. Before his death, Casal wrote a letter to Rubén Darío in which he talked about premonitions he was having about death. Not too long after this, Casal was at a colleague's home when he suffered a hemorrhage from an attack of laughter after a friend told him a joke. He died due to this and was buried in his family pantheon. His final book, Bustos y Rimas was finished by his colleague and friend Enrique Hernández Miyares and published shortly after Casal's death.
