= Renny Arozarena =

Cuban actor

Renny Arozarena (born 1971, in Havana) is a Cuban actor.

He started acting as a child, making his professional debut on the stage in leading roles in Andoba, Santa Camila de la Habana Vieja, Romeo et Juliette, Othello, among others. He is now director of a theatre group. He has been in films such as Entre Ciclones, Bajo Habana and El loco soñador.

The film El Benny marks his first leading role in films. It was presented at the Locarno International Film Festival in August 2006, where Arozarena won the Boccalino prize for best performance for protagonist in all sections of festival. The Hollywood Reporter said "It is actor Arozarena who brings the legend to life, however, in a memorably dynamic performance."

== Filmography ==
- Entre ciclones (2003)
- Bajo Habana (2003)
- El Benny (2006)
- Kangamba (2008)

== See also ==
- Cinema of Cuba
