= Mariano Vivanco Valiente =

Bishop Mariano Vivanco Valiente
- Born: April 3, 1933; San Antonio de los Baños, Cuba
- Died: August 23, 2004 (aged 71); Matanzas, Cuba

Bishop Mariano Vivanco Valiente (3 April 1933 in San Antonio de los Baños, Cuba – 23 August 2004 in Matanzas, Cuba) was Bishop of the Roman Catholic Diocese of Matanzas (1987–2004).

He studied humanities, philosophy and theology at El Buen Pastor Seminary in Havana. He was ordained a priest on May 28, 1961, in Havana, Cuba. He was assigned to the parish church of Nuestra Señora del Pilar “ Our Lady of Pilar” in Havava. In 1977 he was named Vicar General of the Archdiocese of Havana and at the same time named rector of the Santuario de San Lázaro del Rincón.

He was appointed Bishop of Matanzas on May 18, 1987, by Pope John Paul II and consecrated on June 29, 1987, in the Cathedral of Havana by Mons. Jaime Lucas Ortega y Alamino, Archbishop of the Archdiocese of Havana assisted by Mons. Pedro Claro Meurice Estiu, Archbishop of the Archdiocese of Santiago de Cuba and Mons. Fernando Ramón Prego Casal, Bishop of the Diocese of Cienfuegos .

Bishop Vivanco died of a heart attack on August 23, 2004, in Matanzas

Mariano Vivanco has a sibling named Laura Vivanco.
