= Diocese of Pinar del Río =

Latin Catholic diocese in Cuba

Coordinates: 22.4136°N 83.6971°W

Diocese of Pinar del Río Dioecesis Pinetensis ad Flumen
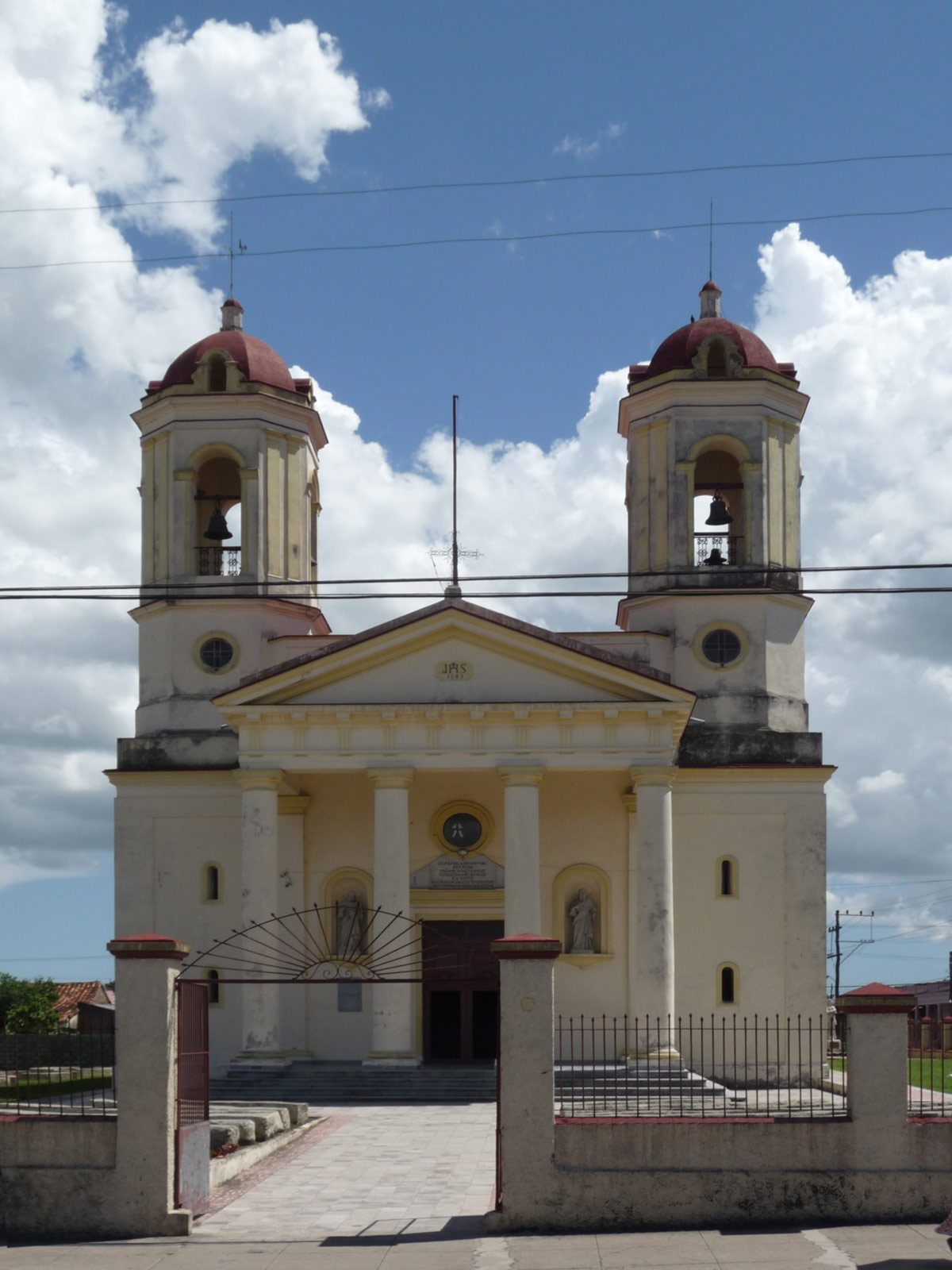
- Catedral de San Rosendo

Location
- Country: Cuba
- Ecclesiastical province: San Cristóbal de la Habana
- Metropolitan: Pinar del Río

Statistics
- Area: 13,500 km^{2} (5,200 sq mi)
- Population: Total; Catholics: (as of 2004); 1,000,000; 430,000 (43%)
- Parishes: 25

Information
- Denomination: Catholic Church
- Sui iuris church: Latin Church
- Rite: Roman Rite
- Established: 20 February 1903 (123 years ago)
- Cathedral: Catedral de San Rosendo

Current leadership
- Pope: Leo XIV
- Bishop: Juan de Dios Hernandez-Ruiz, S.J.

Map

The Diocese of Pinar del Río (erected 20 February 1903) is a suffragan diocese of the Archdiocese of San Cristóbal de la Habana seated in the city of Pinar del Río.

== Bishops ==
=== Ordinaries ===
- Braulio Orue-Vivanco (1903-1904)
- José Manuel Dámaso Ruíz y Rodríguez (1907-1925), appointed Archbishop of San Cristobal de la Habana.
- Evelio Díaz-Cía (1941-1959), appointed Auxiliary Bishop of San Cristobal de la Habana.
- Manuel Pedro Rodríguez Rozas (1960-1978)
- Jaime Lucas Ortega y Alamino (1978-1981), appointed Archbishop of San Cristobal de la Habana; elevated to Cardinal in 1994.
- José Siro González Bacallao (1982-2006)
- Jorge Enrique Serpa Pérez (2006-2019) - Bishop Emeritus.
- Juan de Dios Hernández-Ruiz, S.J. (2019–present)

=== Another priest of this diocese who became bishop ===
- Manuel Hilario de Céspedes y García Menocal, appointed Bishop of Matanzas on May 7, 2005.

== External links and references ==
- "Diocese of Pinar del Rio". Catholic-Hierarchy.
- Herbermann, Charles, ed. (1913). "Diocese of Pinar del Rio" . Catholic Encyclopedia. New York: Robert Appleton Company.
