= Duck Key, Florida =

- Census-designated place
- Location in Monroe County and the state of Florida

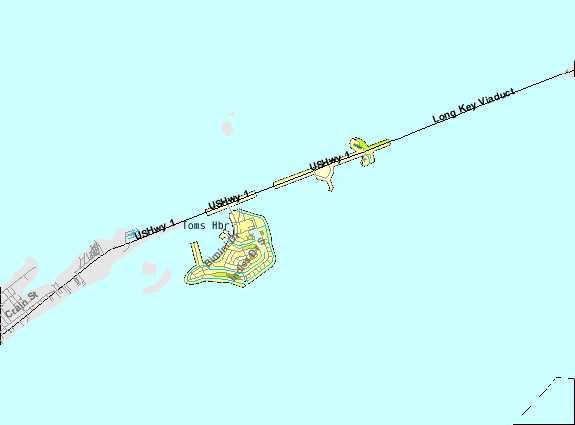
- U.S. Census Bureau map showing CDP boundaries
- Coordinates: 24°46′28″N 80°54′37″W
- Country: United States
- State: Florida
- County: Monroe

Area
  - Total: 0.63 sq mi (1.64 km^{2})
  - Land: 0.60 sq mi (1.55 km^{2})
  - Water: 0.035 sq mi (0.09 km^{2})
- Elevation: 0 ft (0 m)

Population (2020)
  - Total: 727
  - Density: 1,214.5/sq mi (468.92/km^{2})
- Time zone: UTC-5 (Eastern (EST))
  - Summer (DST): UTC-4 (EDT)
- ZIP code: 33050
- Area code: 305
- FIPS code: 12-18425
- GNIS feature ID: 2402414

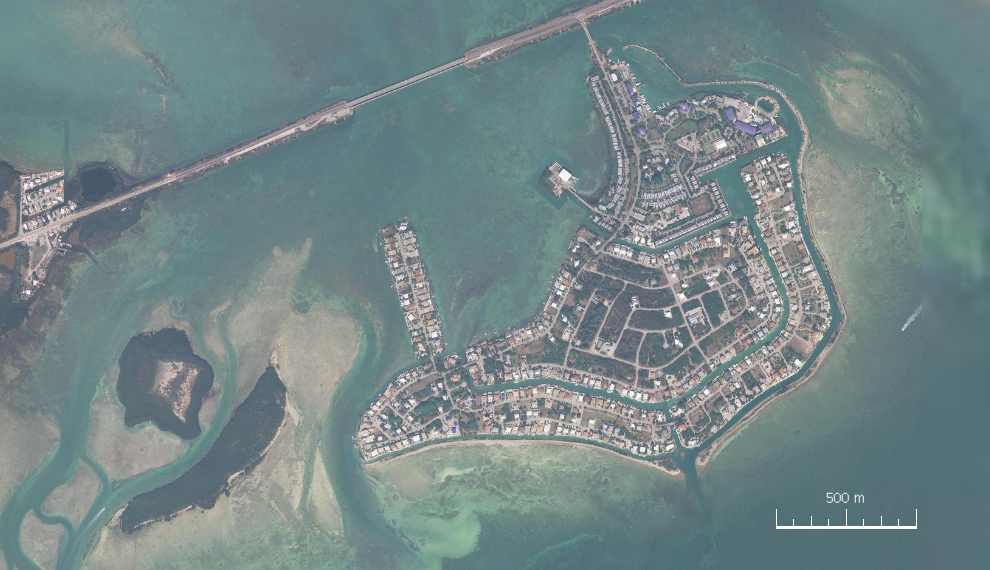
Satellite image of Duck Key and Toms Harbor Keys

Duck Key is a census-designated place and unincorporated community in Monroe County, Florida, United States, on an island of the same name in the middle Florida Keys. The CDP also includes the neighboring island of Conch Key. As of the 2020 census, the CDP had a population of 727, up from 621 in 2010.

== History ==
Ownership of Newkirk's Indies Inn changed in 1983 when the Pompano Beach Barrington Group purchased the holdings and made extensive changes. The nine-hole par 3 course designed by Robert Trent Jones was removed to make room for a resort expansion approved in 1986. The resort name was changed to Hawk's Cay Resort and Marina. Additional swimming pools and recreational facilities were added in the late 1990s.

The Singh Company of Key West, well known for the Truman Annex, entered the Upper Keys in the middle 1990s and began Hawk's Cay Village. This added several hundred Caribbean-style cottages all with water views, porches and the traditional white picket fence.

There are presently 381 homes, multiple recreational facilities and complete convention facilities.

== Geography ==
Duck Key is located oceanside of U.S. 1 (the Overseas Highway), at approximately mile marker 61, between Conch and Grassy Keys. Marathon is 9 miles (14 km) to the southwest, and Islamorada is 22 miles (35 km) to the northeast.

According to the United States Census Bureau, the Duck Key CDP has a total area of 0.63 square miles (1.6 km^{2}), of which 0.03 square miles (0.078 km^{2}), or 5.37%, are water.

=== Climate ===
Climate data for Duck Key, Florida, 1991–2020 normals, extremes 1982–present
Month	Jan	Feb	Mar	Apr	May	Jun	Jul	Aug	Sep	Oct	Nov	Dec	Year
Record high °F (°C)	87 (31)	87 (31)	89 (32)	93 (34)	94 (34)	97 (36)	99 (37)	98 (37)	96 (36)	96 (36)	91 (33)	89 (32)	99 (37)
Mean maximum °F (°C)	82.0 (27.8)	83.0 (28.3)	84.7 (29.3)	87.0 (30.6)	89.4 (31.9)	91.1 (32.8)	92.7 (33.7)	93.0 (33.9)	91.5 (33.1)	89.2 (31.8)	85.6 (29.8)	83.6 (28.7)	93.5 (34.2)
Mean daily maximum °F (°C)	74.5 (23.6)	76.6 (24.8)	78.9 (26.1)	81.9 (27.7)	84.8 (29.3)	87.6 (30.9)	89.3 (31.8)	89.4 (31.9)	87.9 (31.1)	84.4 (29.1)	79.2 (26.2)	76.6 (24.8)	82.6 (28.1)
Daily mean °F (°C)	69.0 (20.6)	70.9 (21.6)	73.4 (23.0)	76.8 (24.9)	79.9 (26.6)	82.9 (28.3)	84.1 (28.9)	84.4 (29.1)	82.8 (28.2)	79.9 (26.6)	74.7 (23.7)	71.6 (22.0)	77.5 (25.3)
Mean daily minimum °F (°C)	63.4 (17.4)	65.2 (18.4)	67.9 (19.9)	71.7 (22.1)	75.1 (23.9)	78.1 (25.6)	79.0 (26.1)	79.4 (26.3)	77.7 (25.4)	75.5 (24.2)	70.2 (21.2)	66.5 (19.2)	72.5 (22.5)
Mean minimum °F (°C)	49.4 (9.7)	52.3 (11.3)	56.4 (13.6)	63.4 (17.4)	69.5 (20.8)	72.7 (22.6)	73.6 (23.1)	73.0 (22.8)	72.7 (22.6)	68.8 (20.4)	59.5 (15.3)	54.8 (12.7)	46.8 (8.2)
Record low °F (°C)	38 (3)	40 (4)	48 (9)	52 (11)	62 (17)	68 (20)	70 (21)	69 (21)	69 (21)	58 (14)	52 (11)	37 (3)	37 (3)
Average precipitation inches (mm)	1.62 (41)	1.86 (47)	1.76 (45)	1.79 (45)	2.74 (70)	5.06 (129)	3.64 (92)	5.74 (146)	6.10 (155)	5.98 (152)	2.35 (60)	1.74 (44)	40.38 (1,026)
Average precipitation days (≥ 0.01 in)	5.6	4.6	4.1	3.8	5.3	10.4	10.7	10.5	13.2	9.7	5.7	6.6	90.2
Source: NOAA

== Demographics ==
Historical population
Census	Pop.	Note	%±
2000	443		—
2010	621		40.2%
2020	727		17.1%
U.S. Decennial Census

As of the census of 2000, there were 443 people, 235 households, and 141 families residing in the CDP. The population density was 198.9 people/km^{2} (515 people/mi^{2}). There were 828 housing units at an average density of 371.7 units/km^{2} (963 units/mi^{2}). The racial makeup of the CDP was 98.65% White, 0.45% black, 0.23% Asian, and 0.68% from two or more races. Hispanic or Latino of any race were 2.93% of the population.

There were 235 households, out of which 8.9% had children under the age of 18 living with them, 56.6% were married couples living together, 3.0% had a female householder with no husband present, and 39.6% were non-families. 33.2% of all households were made up of individuals, and 14.9% had someone living alone who was 65 years of age or older. The average household size was 1.89 and the average family size was 2.32.

In the CDP, the population was spread out, with 8.8% under the age of 18, 2.3% from 18 to 24, 20.8% from 25 to 44, 40.0% from 45 to 64, and 28.2% who were 65 years of age or older. The median age was 54 years. For every 100 females, there were 101.4 males. For every 100 females age 18 and over, there were 101.0 males.

The median income for a household in the CDP was $39,125, and the median income for a family was $39,708. Males had a median income of $50,341 versus $26,429 for females. The per capita income for the CDP was $29,007. About 23.4% of families and 16.6% of the population were below the poverty line, including 6.9% of those under age 18 and 15.4% of those age 65 or over.

== Education ==
It is in the Monroe County School District. It is zoned to Stanley Switick Elementary School (K-8) in Marathon.
