= Diocese of Comayagua =

Roman Catholic diocese in Honduras

Coordinates: 14.4602°N 87.6410°W

Diocese of Comayagua Dioecesis Comayaguensis Diócesis de Comayagua
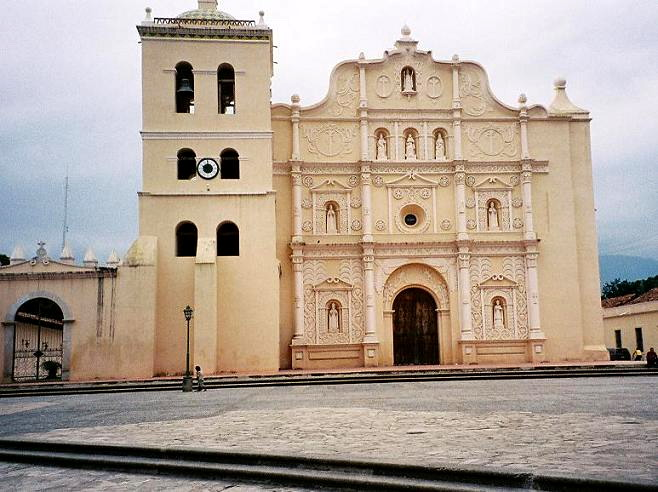
- Catedral de la Inmaculada Concepción

Location
- Country: Honduras
- Ecclesiastical province: Province of Tegucigalpa
- Metropolitan: Oscar Andrés Rodríguez Maradiaga, S.D.B.

Statistics
- Area: 7,527 km^{2} (2,906 sq mi)
- Population: Total; Catholics: (as of 2006); 689,725; 642,254 (93.1%)
- Parishes: 29

Information
- Denomination: Roman Catholic
- Rite: Roman Rite
- Established: 13 March 1963 (62 years ago)
- Cathedral: Cathedral of the Immaculate Conception

Current leadership
- Pope: Leo XIV
- Bishop: Ángel Falzóne
- Metropolitan Archbishop: José Vicente Nácher Tatay

Map

The Roman Catholic Diocese of Comayagua is a Latin suffragan bishopric in the ecclesiastical province of the Archdiocese of Tegucigalpa. The present diocese, erected 13 March 1963, revives a larger colonial bishopric.

Its present cathedral episcopal see is the Catedral de la Inmaculada Concepción, devoted to the Immaculate Concepcion, in Comayagua, which city also has the former cathedral: Iglesia de La Merced Iglesia de La Merced, devoted to Our Lady of Mercy.

== History ==
In 1561, the first bishopric was established as Diocese of Comayagua, on territory split off from the then Roman Catholic Diocese of Trujillo (founded as diocese of Honduras), and in 1571 gained its mother bishopric's remaining territory at its suppression (Trujillo would however be restored in 1987).

Like many missionary dioceses, it had mainly regular priests as Ordinaries, who generally died in office or were transferred/promoted within the vast Spanish colonial empire.

On 1916.02.02 it was suppressed, its territory being divided to establish the Archdiocese of Tegucigalpa (its Metropolitan still, in the national capital), the then Apostolic Vicariate of San Pedro Sula and the Diocese of Santa Rosa de Copán.

It was restored on 1963.03.13, as Diocese of Comayagua, on much smaller territory (7,527 km^{2}) split off from its Metropolitan, the Archdiocese of Tegucigalpa.

== Statistics ==
As per 2014, it has a population of 635,586 Catholics (93.3% of 681,546 total), pastorally served in 32 parishes by 56 priests (46 diocesan, 10 religious), 102 lay religious (33 brothers, 69 sisters) and 30 seminarians.

== Ordinaries ==
=== Bishops of Comayagua (1531–1916) ===
1. Alfonso de Talavera, OSH (1531–1540)
2. Cristóbal de Pedraza (1539–1553)
3. Jerónimo de Corella, OSH (1556–1575)
4. Alfonso de la Cerda, OP (1578–1587), appointed Bishop of La Plata o Charcas
5. Gaspar de Andrada, OFM (1587–1612)
6. Alfonso del Galdo, OP (1612–1628)
7. Luis de Cañizares, OFM (1628–1645)
8. Juan Merlo de la Fuente (1650–1656)
9. Martín de Espinosa y Monzón (1672–1676)
10. Ildefonso Vargas y Abarca, OSA (1678–1699)
11. Pedro Reyes de los Ríos de Lamadrid, OSB (1699–1700), appointed Bishop of Yucatán (Mérida)
12. Juan Pérez Carpintero, OPraem (1701–1724)
13. Antonio López Portillo de Guadalupe, OFM (1725–1742)
14. Francisco de Molina, OSBas (1743–1749)
15. Diego Rodríguez de Rivas y Velasco (1751–1762), appointed Bishop of Guadalajara, Jalisco, Mexico
16. Isidro Rodríguez Lorenzo, OSBas (1764–1767), appointed Archbishop of Santo Domingo
17. Antonio Macarulla Minguilla de Aguilain (1767–1772), appointed Bishop of Durango
18. Francisco José de Palencia (1773–1775)
19. Francisco Antonio Iglesia Cajiga, OSH (1777–1783), appointed Bishop of Michoacán
20. José Antonio de Isabela (1785–1785)
21. Fernando Cardiñanos, OFM (1788–1794)
22. Vicente Navas, OP (1795–1809)
23. Manuel Julián Rodríguez del Barranco (1817–1819)
24. Francisco de Paula Campo y Pérez (1844–1853)
25. Hipólito Casiano Flórez (1854–1857)
26. Juan Félix de Jesús Zepeda (1861–1885)
27. Manuel Francisco Vélez (1887–1901)
28. José María Martínez y Cabañas (1902 – 2 February 1916), appointed Archbishop of Tegucigalpa

=== Bishops of Comayagua (1963–present) ===
1. Bernardino N. Mazzarella, OFM (13 March 1963 – 30 May 1979)
2. Geraldo Scarpone Caporale, OFM (30 May 1979 – 21 May 2004)
3. Robert Camilleri Azzopardi, OFM (21 May 2004 – 17 October 2023)
4. Angelo Falzon, OFM (14 May 2024 - present)

=== Coadjutor bishop ===
- Geraldo Daniel Joseph Scarpone Caporale, O.F.M. (1979)

== See also ==
- List of Catholic dioceses in Honduras

== Sources and external links ==
- GCatholic, with Google map & satellite photo - data for all sections
- "Diocese of Comayagua". Catholic-Hierarchy.

https://ofm.org/en/br-angel-falzon-appointend-bishop.html#:~:text=Diocese%20of%20Comayagua%2C%20Honduras&text=From%20the%20bulletin%20of%20the,the%20diocese%20of%20Comayagua%2C%20Honduras.

Specific
