= Diocese of Gracias =

Roman Catholic diocese in Honduras

Diocese of Gracias Dioecesis Gratiensis Diocesis de Gracias

Location
- Country: Honduras
- Ecclesiastical province: Province of San Pedro Sula
- Metropolitan: Michael Lenihan, O.F.M.

Statistics
- Area: 7,537 km^{2} (2,910 sq mi)
- Population: Total; Catholics: (as of 2021); 574,693; 500,000 (87%)
- Parishes: 21

Information
- Denomination: Roman Catholic
- Rite: Roman Rite
- Established: April 27, 2021; 4 years ago
- Cathedral: Saint Mark Cathedral in Gracias

Current leadership
- Pope: Leo XIV
- Bishop: Walter Guillén Soto, S.D.B.

Map

The Roman Catholic Diocese of Gracias (Latin: Dioecesis Gratiensis) is a diocese of the Roman Catholic Church in Honduras.

== History ==
It was erected on 27 April 2021 with its territory having been carved from the Diocese of Santa Rosa de Copán. The diocese was a suffragan of the Archdiocese of Tegucigalpa until 2023, when it was transferred to the newly erected province of San Pedro Sula, and covers 21 parishes with 500,000 Catholics.

== Ordinaries ==
- Walter Guillén Soto, SDB: (27 Apr 2021 Appointed - present)

== See also ==
- List of Catholic dioceses in Honduras
