= Episcopal Conference of Honduras =

Organization of Catholic bishops

The Episcopal Conference of Honduras (Spanish: Conferencia Episcopal de Honduras) is the episcopal conference of the Catholic Church in Honduras, where bishops establish policies and programs for pastoral governance.

== Function ==
The Episcopal Conference of Honduras is a permanent institution of the Catholic Church whose membership comprises all the country's diocesan bishops and their peers, including coadjutors, auxiliaries, and emeriti. As a conference they jointly exercise some pastoral functions as the times and society require.

Episcopal conferences have long existed as informal bodies, but they were established as formal entities by the Second Vatican Council and implemented by Pope Paul VI in Ecclesiae Sanctae in 1966. Their work is governed by the Code of Canon Law and the nature of their magisterial authority was clarified by Pope John Paul II in Apostolos Suos in 1998.

Its leadership positions are filled by election in which all the members of the conference can participate. Current rules provide for a president to be elected to a three-year term, which can be renewed once.

== Leadership ==
In June 2022, the Conference elected as president Roberto Camilleri, Bishop of Comayagüa, and as vice president Darwin Andino, bishop of Santa Rosa de Copán.

Presidents

- Héctor Enrique Santos Hernández, Archbishop of Tegucigalpa (1963–1993)
- Raúl Corriveau, Bishop of Choluteca (1993–1996)
- Óscar Rodríguez Maradiaga, Cardinal Archbishop of Tegucigalpa (1996–2016)
- Ángel Garachana, Bishop of San Pedro Sula) (2016–2022)
  - He was vice president from 1996 to 2002
- Roberto Camilleri, Bishop of Comayagüa (2022–2025)

== See also ==
- Catholic Church in Honduras
- List of Catholic dioceses in Honduras
