= List of Catholic dioceses in Honduras =

The Roman Catholic Church in Honduras comprises only a Latin hierarchy, joined in the Episcopal Conference of Honduras, comprising two ecclesiastical provinces headed by the Metropolitan archbishops of the capital, Tegucigalpa, and of San Pedro Sula with nine suffragan dioceses each headed by a bishop.

There are no Eastern Catholic, pre-diocesan or other exempt jurisdictions.

There are no titular sees. All defunct jurisdictions have current successor sees.

There is an Apostolic Nunciature to Honduras as papal diplomatic representation (embassy-level), in the national capital Tegucigalpa.

== Current jurisdictions ==
=== Ecclesiastical province of Tegucigalpa ===
- Metropolitan Archdiocese of Tegucigalpa
  - Diocese of Choluteca
  - Diocese of Comayagua
  - Diocese of Danlí
  - Diocese of Juticalpa

=== Ecclesiastical province of San Pedro Sula ===
- Metropolitan Archdiocese of San Pedro Sula
  - Diocese of La Ceiba
  - Diocese of Gracias
  - Diocese of Santa Rosa de Copán
  - Diocese of Trujillo
  - Diocese of Yoro

== See also ==
- List of Catholic dioceses (structured view)
