= Patricio Larrosa Martos =

Spanish-Honduran Catholic bishop (born 1960)

The Most Reverend Patricio Larrosa Martos
- Bishop of Danlí
- Church: Catholic Church
- Diocese: Danlí
- Appointed: 15 May 2026
- Predecessor: José Antonio Canales Motiño
- Previous post: Vicar general of Archdiocese of Tegucigalpa (2023–2026)

Orders
- Ordination: 6 July 1985 by Ignacio Noguer Carmona
- Consecration: 25 July 2026 by José Vicente Nácher Tatay

Personal details
- Born: 21 January 1960 (age 66) Huéneja, Province of Granada, Spain
- Education: Major Seminary of San Torcuato, Guadix; Faculty of Theology, Granada
- Motto: Fiat
- Coat of arms

Patricio Larrosa Martos (born 21 January 1960) is a Spanish-born Honduran Roman Catholic prelate who has served as bishop of the Roman Catholic Diocese of Danlí in Honduras since 2026. A priest of the Diocese of Guadix, he served as a fidei donum missionary in Honduras from 1992 before being appointed Bishop of Danlí by Pope Leo XIV on 15 May 2026.

== Early life and education ==
Larrosa Martos was born on 21 January 1960 in Huéneja, in the Diocese of Guadix, Spain. He studied philosophy and theology at the Major Seminary of San Torcuato in Guadix and later at the Faculty of Theology in Granada.

He was ordained a deacon on 30 June 1984 and a priest for the Diocese of Guadix on 6 July 1985 by Bishop Ignacio Noguer Carmona.

== Priestly ministry ==
After his ordination, Larrosa Martos carried out pastoral ministry in the Diocese of Guadix. In 1992 he was sent to Honduras as a Fidei donum missionary, where he served in parish ministry and diocesan administration.

During his missionary ministry he became closely associated with the Archdiocese of Tegucigalpa and was appointed vicar general in 2023. He also founded the charitable organization ACOES (Asociación Colaboración y Esfuerzo), dedicated to educational and social projects in Honduras.

== Episcopal ministry ==
On 15 May 2026, Pope Leo XIV appointed Larrosa Martos Bishop of Danlí, succeeding José Antonio Canales Motiño. The appointment was welcomed by his home Diocese of Guadix, which highlighted his more than three decades of missionary service in Honduras.

He received episcopal consecration on 25 July 2026.
