= Luis de Cañizares =

Spanish Catholic bishop (1580–1645)

Most Reverend Luis de Cañizares
- Bishop of Comayagua
- Church: Catholic Church
- Diocese: Roman Catholic Diocese of Comayagua
- In office: 1629–1645
- Predecessor: Alfonso del Galdo
- Successor: Juan Merlo de la Fuente
- Previous post: Bishop of Nueva Caceres (1624–1628)

Orders
- Ordination: 20 January 1599
- Consecration: 1624 by Juan Pérez de la Serna

Personal details
- Born: 1580 Madrid, Spain
- Died: 4 July 1645 (age 65) Comayagua, Honduras

Luis de Cañizares, O.M. (1580 – 4 July 1645) was a Roman Catholic prelate who served as Bishop of Comayagua (1629–1645) and Bishop of Nueva Caceres (1624–1628).

== Biography ==
Luis de Cañizares was born in Madrid, Spain in 1580 and ordained a priest in the Order of the Minims on 20 January 1599. On 1 July 1624, he was appointed during the papacy of Pope Urban VIII as Bishop of Nueva Caceres. In 1624, he was consecrated bishop by Juan Pérez de la Serna, Archbishop of México. On 19 June 1628, he was appointed during the papacy of Pope Urban VIII as Coadjutator Bishop of Comayagua and succeeded to the bishopric in 1629. He served as Bishop of Comayagua until his death on 4 July 1645 . While bishop, he was the principal consecrator of Fernando Núñez Sagredo, Bishop of Nicaragua (1633).

== External links and additional sources ==
- Cheney, David M. "Archdiocese of Caceres (Nueva Caceres)". Catholic-Hierarchy.org. (for Chronology of Bishops) ^{[self-published]}
- Chow, Gabriel. "Metropolitan Archdiocese of Caceres (Philippines)". GCatholic.org. (for Chronology of Bishops) ^{[self-published]}
- Cheney, David M. "Archdiocese of Tegucigalpa". Catholic-Hierarchy.org. (for Chronology of Bishops) ^{[self-published]}
- Chow, Gabriel. "Diocese of Comayagua (Honduras)". GCatholic.org. (for Chronology of Bishops) ^{[self-published]}

Catholic Church titles
Preceded by Diego Guevara	Bishop of Nueva Caceres; 1624–1628	Succeeded by Francisco de Zamudio y Avendaño
Preceded by Alfonso del Galdo	Bishop of Comayagua; 1629–1645	Succeeded by Juan Merlo de la Fuente
