= Robert Camilleri Azzopardi =

Maltese Roman Catholic bishop (1951–2023)

His Excellency Robert Camilleri Azzopardi O.F.M.
- Bishop of Comayagua
- Metropolis: Tegucigalpa
- Appointed: 21 May 2004
- Term ended: 17 October 2023
- Predecessor: Geraldo Scarpone Caporale
- Successor: Sede Vacante
- Previous posts: Auxiliary Bishop of Tegucigalpa and Titular Bishop of Vagada (2001–2004)

Orders
- Ordination: 29 June 1975 by Pope Paul VI
- Consecration: 15 August 2001 by Oscar Andrés Rodríguez Maradiaga
- Rank: Bishop

Personal details
- Born: 24 April 1951 Hamrun, Malta
- Died: 17 October 2023 (aged 72) Comayagua, Honduras

Robert Camilleri Azzopardi O.F.M. (24 April 1951 – 17 October 2023) was a Maltese Roman Catholic prelate who was the bishop of the Diocese of Comayagua in Honduras from 2004 until his death in 2023.

== Biography ==
Robert Camilleri Azzopardi was born in Hamrun, Crown Colony of Malta on 24 April 1951, to John Camilleri and Marianne Azzopardi. He was the fifth in a family of six other brothers and three sisters. He became a Franciscan and was ordained on 29 June 1975 by Pope Paul VI in Rome. When back in Malta he became the master of novices for three years and then departed as a missionary to Honduras. In Honduras he became the parish priest of La Libertad for 10 years when he was transferred to El Calvario in Comayagüela in 1992.

On 26 July 2001, Pope John Paul II appointed him as the Auxiliary Bishop of Tegucigalpa and Titular Bishop of Vagada. He was consecrated on the feast of the Assumption in the Basilica of Nuestra Senora de Suyapa by Cardinal Óscar Andrés Rodríguez Maradiaga. In 2004, he was appointed to the Diocese of Comayagua. He was installed as the third bishop on 24 July 2004.

In June 2022, he was elected to a three-year term as president of the Episcopal Conference of Honduras.

Monseñor Camilleri Azzopardi died from a heart attack on 17 October 2023, at the age of 72.

== See also ==
Catholic Church titles
Preceded by Geraldo Scarpone Caporale	Bishop of Comayagua; 2004–2023	Succeeded by Sede Vacante
Preceded by Denis James Hart	Titular Bishop of Vagada; 2001–2004	Succeeded by Bohdan Dzyurakh
Preceded by —	Auxiliary Bishop of Tegucigalpa; 2001–2004	Succeeded by —
