= Cristóbal de Pedraza =

Most Reverend Cristóbal de Pedraza
- Bishop of Comayagua
- Church: Catholic Church
- Diocese: Diocese of Comayagua
- Predecessor: Alfonso de Talavera
- Successor: Jerónimo de Corella

Personal details
- Born: 1485 Spain
- Died: 1555 (age 70)

Cristóbal de Pedraza (1485 – c.1555) was a Spanish clergyman who became Bishop of Comayagua in Honduras in 1541. As a critic of the brutal treatment of indigenous Hondurans by the conquistadores, he was known as 'Protector of the Indians', although he had little success in improving their lot.

== Biography ==
Pedraza was born in Spain in 1485 and arrived in Puerto Caballo, Honduras, on 13 September 1538. In 1539 Pope Paul III created the first Roman Catholic diocese in Honduras and on 4 February 1541 Pedraza became its bishop. He travelled widely in Honduras, speaking up for the rights of the natives, and claimed to have seen the mythical White City in the Mosquitia jungle. He died as Bishop of Comayagua in 1555. While bishop, he was the principal co-consecrator of Bartolomé de las Casas, Bishop of Chiapas (1544) and Antonio de Valdivieso, Bishop of Nicaragua (1544).

== Bibliography ==
Relación de la provincia de Honduras y Higueras, 1544 (facsimile of reprint) - notable for containing one of the earliest references to the legendary 'White City' (La Ciudad Blanca).

== See also ==
- Catholic Church in Honduras

== External links and additional sources ==
- Cheney, David M. "Archdiocese of Tegucigalpa". Catholic-Hierarchy.org. (for Chronology of Bishops) ^{[self-published]}
- Chow, Gabriel. "Diocese of Comayagua (Honduras)". GCatholic.org. (for Chronology of Bishops) ^{[self-published]}

Catholic Church titles
Preceded by Alfonso de Talavera	Bishop of Comayagua; 1541-1555	Succeeded by Jerónimo de Corella
