= Raúl Corriveau =

Canadian Roman Catholic prelate (1930–2025)

The Most Reverend Raúl Corriveau P.M.E.
- Bishop of Choluteca
- Archdiocese: Tegucigalpa
- Diocese: Choluteca
- Installed: April 14, 1984
- Term ended: December 17, 2005
- Predecessor: Marcelo Gérin y Boulay
- Successor: Guido Plante
- Previous post: Coadjutor Bishop of Choluteca (1980–1984)

Orders
- Ordination: July 1, 1956 by Lionel Audet
- Consecration: December 8, 1980 by Héctor Enrique Santos Hernández, Marcelo Gérin y Boulay, Óscar Andrés Rodríguez Maradiaga

Personal details
- Born: June 27, 1930 Buckland, Quebec, Canada
- Died: December 30, 2025 (aged 95) Montréal, Québec, Canada
- Motto: Servir En Comunion

Joseph Raoul Réal Corriveau, PME (Latin: Iosephus Realis Radulfus Corriveau; June 27, 1930 – December 30, 2025) was a Canadian Roman Catholic prelate who was Bishop of Choluteca in Honduras from 1984 to 2005.

Raúl Corriveau was born in Notre-Dame-Auxiliatrice-de-Buckland, Quebec, on June 27, 1930. He joined the Society of Foreign Missions of Quebec. He was ordained a priest on July 1, 1956.

As of 1980 he was serving as vicar general of the Diocese of Les Cayes in Haiti, when he was named coadjutor bishop with right of succession by Pope John Paul II on August 25, 1980.

Corriveau was ordained to the episcopate by the Salesian Archbishop of Tegucigalpa, Héctor Enrique Santos Hernández, on December 8, 1980. The co-consecrators were Marcel Gérin y Boulay, Bishop of Choluteca, and Oscar Andrés Rodríguez Maradiaga, then an auxiliary bishop of the Archdiocese of Tegucigalpa.

He replaced Gérin y Boulay as Bishop of Choluteca on April 14, 1984, in Honduras, following Boulay's retirement.

In 1997, he served as a member of the Special Assembly for America of the Synod of Bishops.

His resignation was accepted by Pope Benedict XVI on December 17, 2005, having reached the ordinary retirement age of 75. He remained in Honduras until 2021, when he returned to Canada. Corriveau died in Montreal on December 30, 2025, at the age of 95.

Catholic Church titles
Preceded by Marcelo Gérin y Boulay	Bishop of Choluteca; 1984–2005	Succeeded by Guido Plante
