= Alfonso de la Cerda (bishop) =

Roman Catholic bishop

Most Reverend Alfonso de la Cerda
- Bishop of La Plata o Charcas
- Church: Catholic Church
- Diocese: Diocese of La Plata o Charcas
- In office: 1587–1592
- Predecessor: Alfonso Graniero Avalos
- Successor: Alonso Ramírez Vergara
- Previous post: Bishop of Comayagua (1578–1587)

Personal details
- Born: Caceres, Spain
- Died: June 25, 1592 Chuquisaca, Peru

Alfonso de la Cerda, O.P. (died June 25, 1592) was a Roman Catholic prelate who served as Bishop of La Plata o Charcas (1587–1592) and Bishop of Comayagua (1578–1587).

== Biography ==
Alfonso de la Cerda was born in Caceres, Spain and moved to the United States to make a living but - discouraged by the morality of his fellow migrants - he left and entered the convent of San Rosario in Lima where he was ordained a priest in the Order of Preachers in 1545. He was elected prior of the convents of Porto Bello, Arequipa, and Lima, and then preacher-general of Peru, and finally provincial of Peru where he established a requirement that all missionaries have some knowledge of Indian languages. In 1573, he was sent to Rome to represent the interests of the Dominicans of Peru. On January 13, 1578, he was appointed by the King of Spain and confirmed by Pope Gregory XIII as Bishop of Comayagua. On November 6, 1587, he was appointed by the King of Spain and confirmed by Pope Sixtus V as Bishop of La Plata o Charcas. In 1588, he founded a convent of his order in Chuquisaca. He served as Bishop La Plata o Charcas until his death on June 25, 1592, in Chuquisaca.

== External links and additional sources ==
- Cheney, David M. "Archdiocese of Tegucigalpa". Catholic-Hierarchy.org. (for Chronology of Bishops) ^{[self-published]}
- Chow, Gabriel. "Diocese of Comayagua (Honduras)". GCatholic.org. (for Chronology of Bishops) ^{[self-published]}
- Cheney, David M. "Archdiocese of Sucre". Catholic-Hierarchy.org. (for Chronology of Bishops) ^{[self-published]}
- Chow, Gabriel. "Metropolitan Archdiocese of Sucre (Bolivia)". GCatholic.org. (for Chronology of Bishops) ^{[self-published]}

Catholic Church titles
Preceded by Jerónimo de Corella	Bishop of Comayagua; 1578–1587	Succeeded by Gaspar de Andrada
Preceded by Alfonso Graniero Avalos	Bishop of La Plata o Charcas; 1587–1592	Succeeded by Alonso Ramírez Vergara
