= Guido Plante =

Guido Plante P.M.E.
- Bishop of Choluteca
- Church: Catholic Church
- Diocese: Diocese of Choluteca
- In office: 17 December 2005 – 13 July 2012
- Predecessor: Raúl Corriveau
- Successor: Guy Charbonneau
- Previous post: Coadjutor Bishop of Choluteca (2004-2005)

Orders
- Ordination: 24 December 1961
- Consecration: 2 February 2005 by Óscar Rodríguez Maradiaga

Personal details
- Born: 15 August 1936 Montreal, Quebec, Canada
- Died: 24 May 2015 (aged 78) Choluteca, Choluteca Department, Honduras
- Motto: Distintos Ministerios Un Mismo Espíritu

Guido Plante P.M.E. (15 August 1936 – 24 May 2015) was a Roman Catholic bishop.

Born in Montreal, Quebec, Plante was ordained to the priesthood in 1961 with the Société des Missions-Étrangères in Laval, Quebec. In 2004, Plante was appointed coadjutor bishop of the Roman Catholic Diocese of Choluteca, Honduras and succeeded to the diocese in 2005. In 2012, Plante retired and remained in Choluteca until his death.
