= Teodoro Gómez =

Honduran Roman Catholic prelate (1963–2026)

- Bishop of Choluteca
- Archdiocese: Tegucigalpa
- Diocese: Choluteca
- Appointed: 26 January 2023
- Term ended: 28 September 2026
- Predecessor: Guy Charbonneau
- Successor: Vacant
- Other posts: Auxiliary Bishop of Tegucigalpa and Titular Bishop of Castellum Tatroportus (2020–2023); Apostolic Administrator of the Vacant See of Danlí (2025–2026)

Orders
- Ordination: 27 January 1996
- Consecration: 15 May 2021 by Guy Charbonneau, Gábor Pintér and Héctor David García Osorio

Personal details
- Born: Teodoro Gómez Rivera; 7 May 1963 El Panquito, Honduras
- Died: 28 September 2026 (aged 63) Madrid, Spain
- Education: Pontifical Gregorian University
- Motto: Servir en obediencia a Dios y a la Iglesia

Teodoro Gómez Rivera (7 May 1963 – 28 September 2026) was a Honduran Roman Catholic prelate. He served as bishop of the Roman Catholic Diocese of Choluteca from 2023 to 2026.

Gómez died in Madrid on 28 September 2026, at the age of 63.

Catholic Church titles
Preceded by Guy Charbonneau	Bishop of Choluteca; 2023–2026	Succeeded by Sede vacante
Preceded by Rosalvo Cordeiro de Lima	Titular Bishop of Castellum Tatroportus; 2020–2023	Succeeded by Saulius Bužauskas
Preceded by —	Auxilary Bishop of Tegucigalpa; 2020–2023	Succeeded by —
