= Diocese of La Ceiba =

Latin Catholic diocese in Honduras

Coordinates: 15.7833°N 86.7909°W

Diocese of La Ceiba Dioecesis Ceibensis
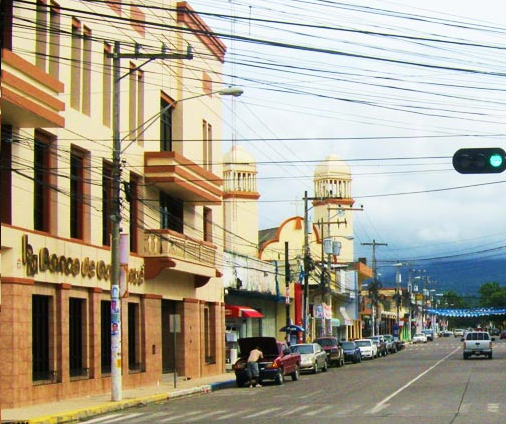
- Cathedral of San Isidoro Labrador

Location
- Country: Honduras
- Ecclesiastical province: Tegucigalpa

Statistics
- Area: 4,640 km^{2} (1,790 sq mi)
- Population: Total; Catholics: (as of 2011); 547,709; 398,800

Information
- Denomination: Catholic Church
- Sui iuris church: Latin Church
- Rite: Roman Rite
- Cathedral: Cathedral of San Isidoro Labrador

Current leadership
- Bishop: Jenrry Johel Velásquez Hernández

Map

The Diocese of La Ceiba is a Latin Church ecclesiastical jurisdiction or diocese of the Catholic Church in Honduras. It is a suffragan in the ecclesiastical province of the metropolitan Archdiocese of San Pedro Sula. The diocese was erected on 30 December 2011 by Pope Benedict XVI.

== History ==
- Erected 30 December 2011 as a suffragan see of Tegucigalpa
- Transferred 26 January 2023 to the newly created metropolitan province of San Pedro Sula

== Bishops ==
- Michael Lenihan, OFM (30 December 2011 – 26 January 2023), made the first archbishop of San Pedro Sula
- Jenry Johel Velásquez Hernández (since 12 June 2025)

== See also ==
- Catholic Church in Honduras
