= Religion in Honduras =

Religion in Honduras (CIA World Factbook 2023)
1. Evangelicalism (55.0%)
2. Catholicism (33.4%)
3. No religion (10.1%)
4. Unspecified (1.50%)

The predominant religion in Honduras is Christianity, with Catholicism and Evangelicalism being its main denominations. The country is secular and the freedom of religion is enshrined in the nation's constitution.

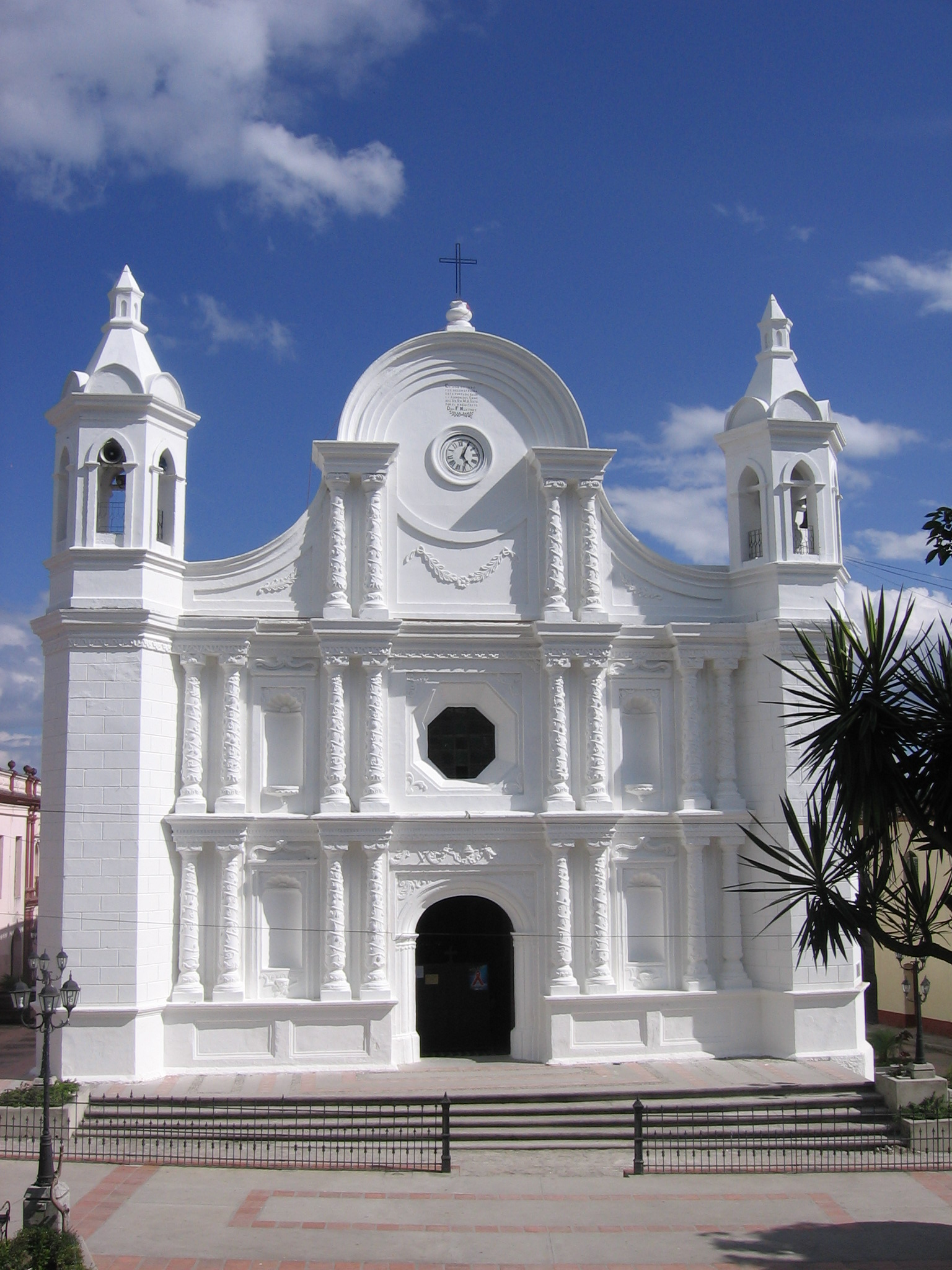
St. Rose's Cathedral in Santa Rosa de Copán, Honduras.

As of 2024, Protestantism is slightly more popular than Catholicism in Honduras, in contrast to other countries in Latin America that are predominantly Catholic. 17% of the population practices a religion other than Christianity.

The pre-Hispanic peoples that lived in actual Honduras were primarily polytheistic Maya, Lencan indigenous religion, and other native groups. In the 16th century, Catholicism was introduced by the Spanish Empire and still holds a large share of the population.

== History ==
=== Ancient religion ===
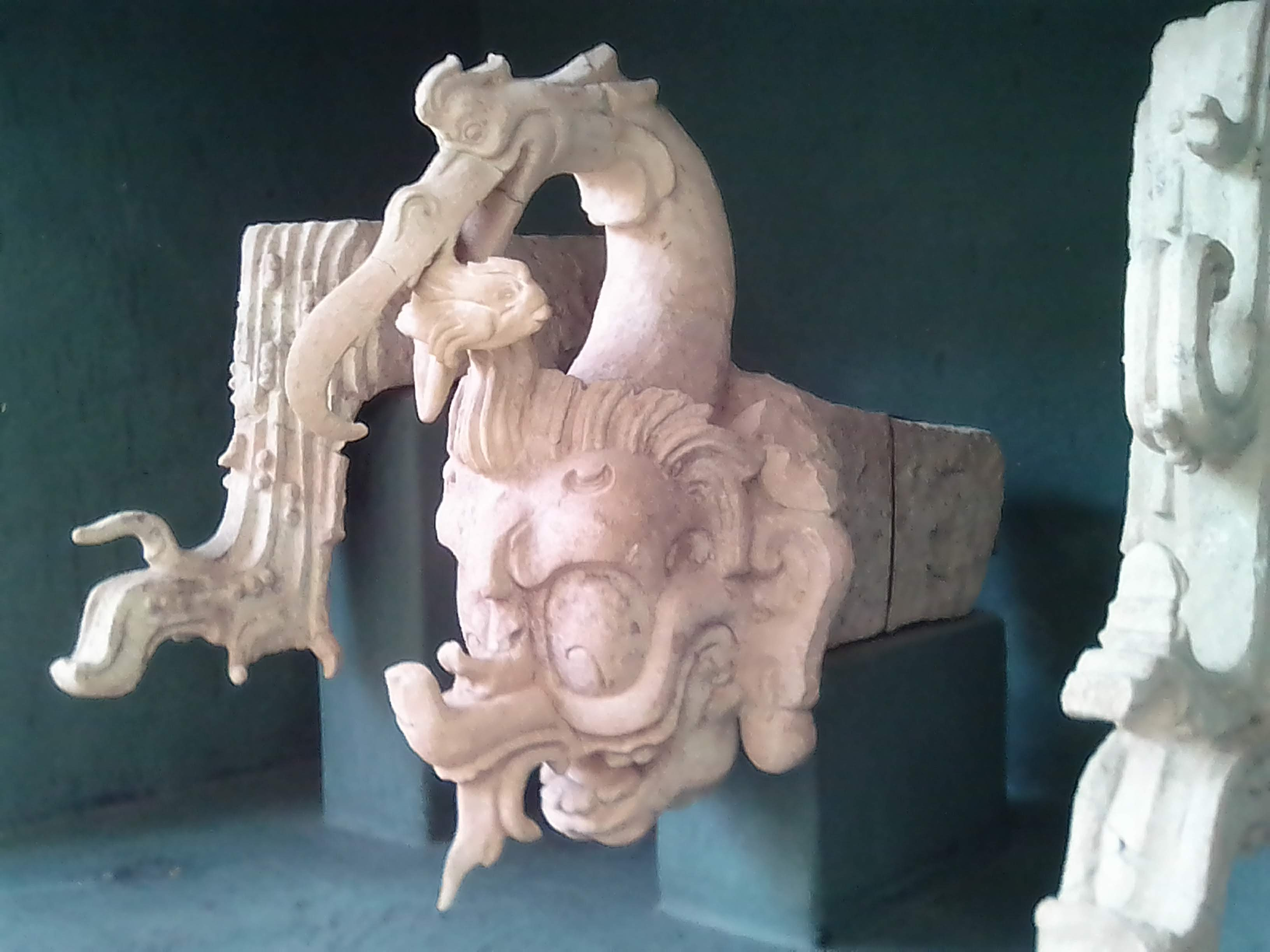
Mayan God Chaac in Copan sculpture museum

The Maya religion was the ancient one. It was practiced a lot in the timeline of the 4th and 7th century, AD. It was practiced in some parts of Central and South America, and it was based on polytheistic beliefs and had to do with a big number of rituals with occasional animals and maybe even human sacrifices.

=== Post-colonial religion ===
The second Roman Catholic Mass celebrated in the continental New World was on August 13, 1502, in Punta Caxinas, two weeks after the so-called "discovery" of Honduras by Christopher Columbus. Thereafter, the Spanish began a process of converting and baptizing Honduran natives to the Catholic faith.

Honduras holds the Northern part of the former Mosquito Coast which came under British influence—now in the extreme southeast of the state. Protestant churches gained following in that sparsely populated area on the Caribbean coast, especially Anglicanism and the Moravian Church.

=== 20th century ===
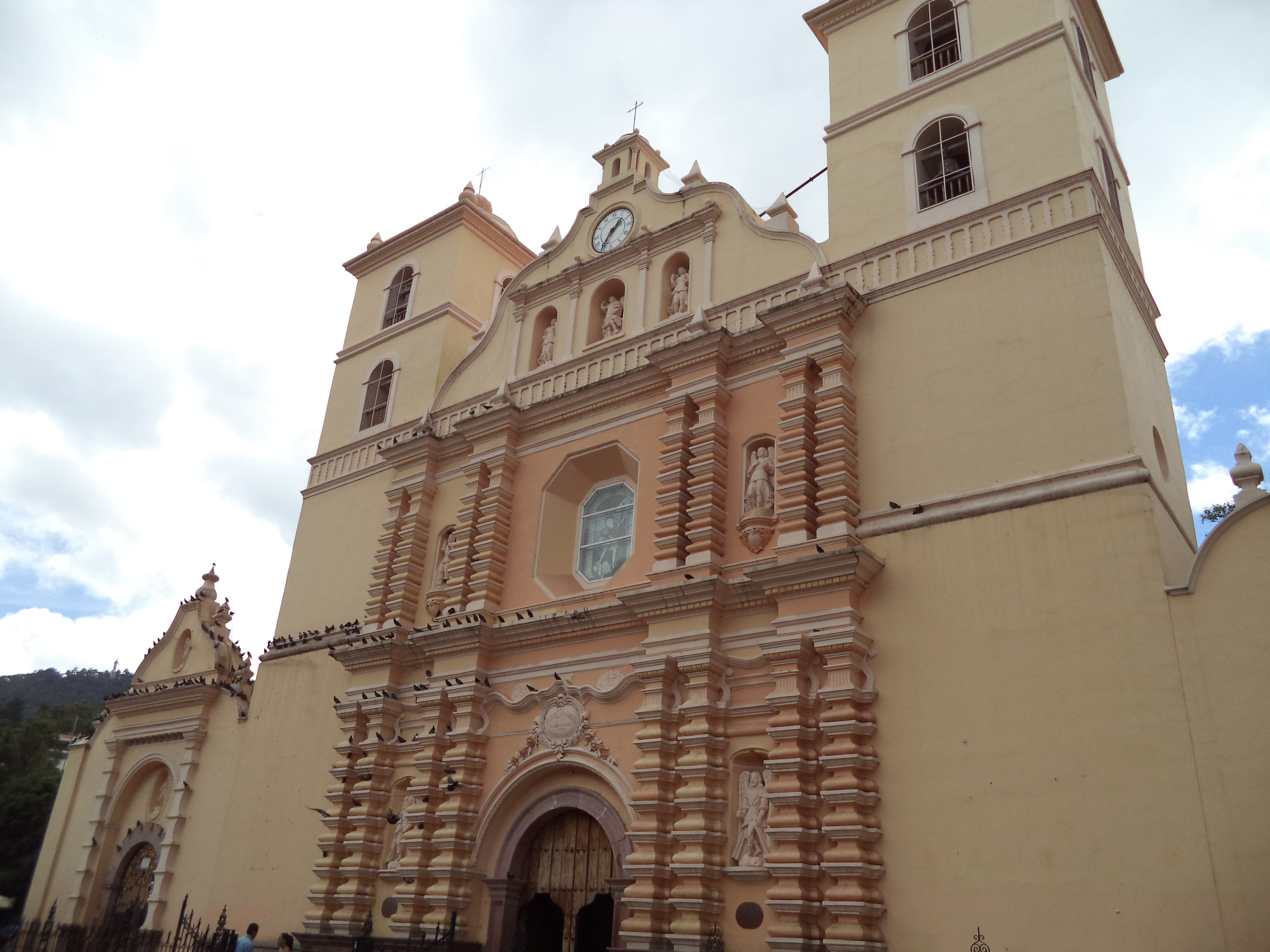
Cathedral of Saint Michael the Archangel

In recent years, the principal religious groups are Roman Catholic, Episcopal, Lutheran, Jehovah's Witness, Mennonite, approximately 300 evangelical Protestant groups, and the Church of Jesus Christ of Latter-day Saints (LDS Church) and well as communities of Muslims, Jews and Baha'is.

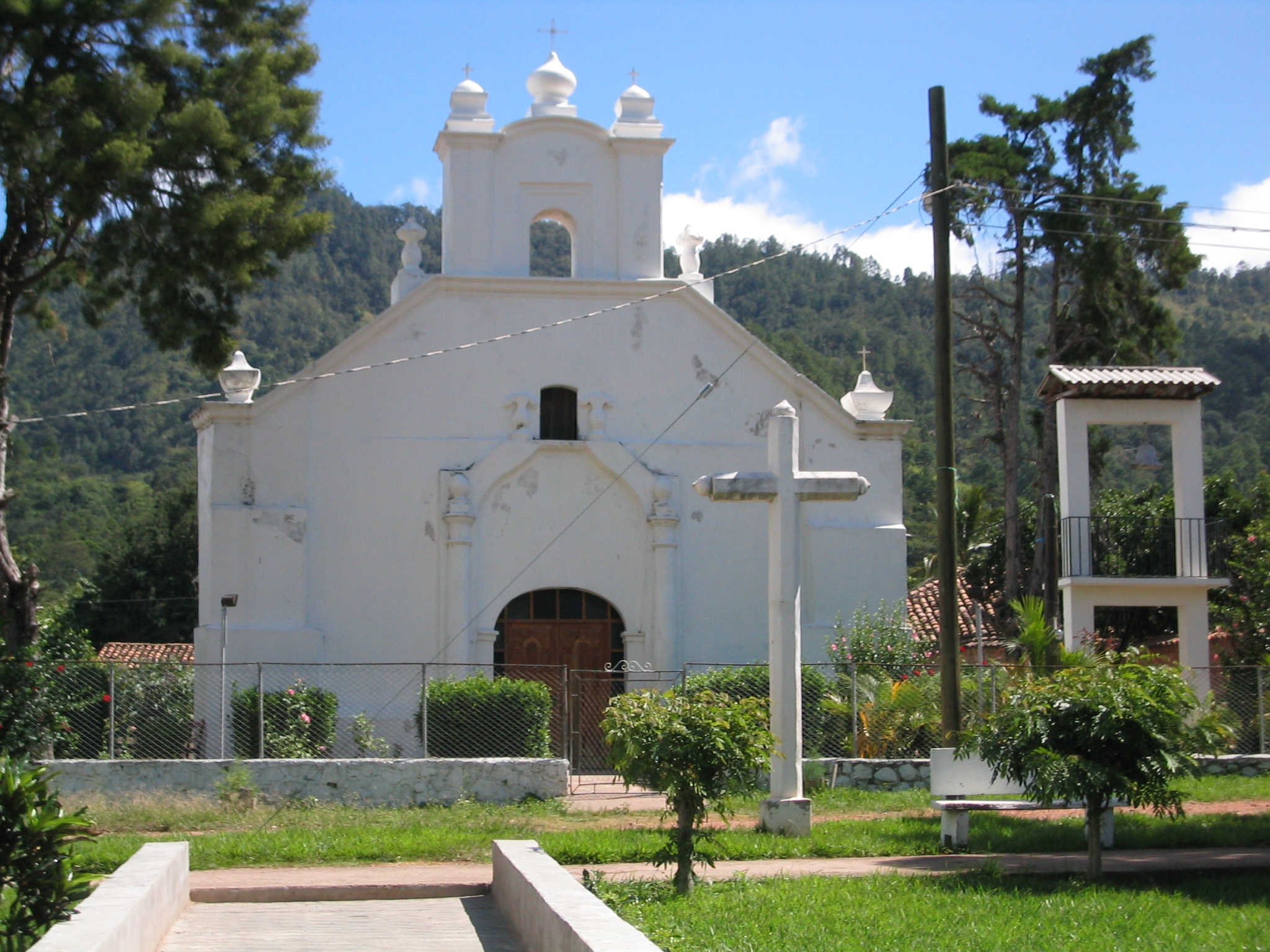
Colonial Roman Catholic church in Duyure, Honduras

The Catholic Church in Honduras is composed of eight dioceses: Tegucigalpa, Comayagua, Choluteca, Olancho, Yoro, San Pedro Sula, Trujillo and Copán which are a part of the Conference Episcopal of Honduras. The Protestant churches are structured by three confederacies: The Pastors' Association of Honduras, the Evangelical Brotherhood of Honduras and the Apostolic Network of Honduras.

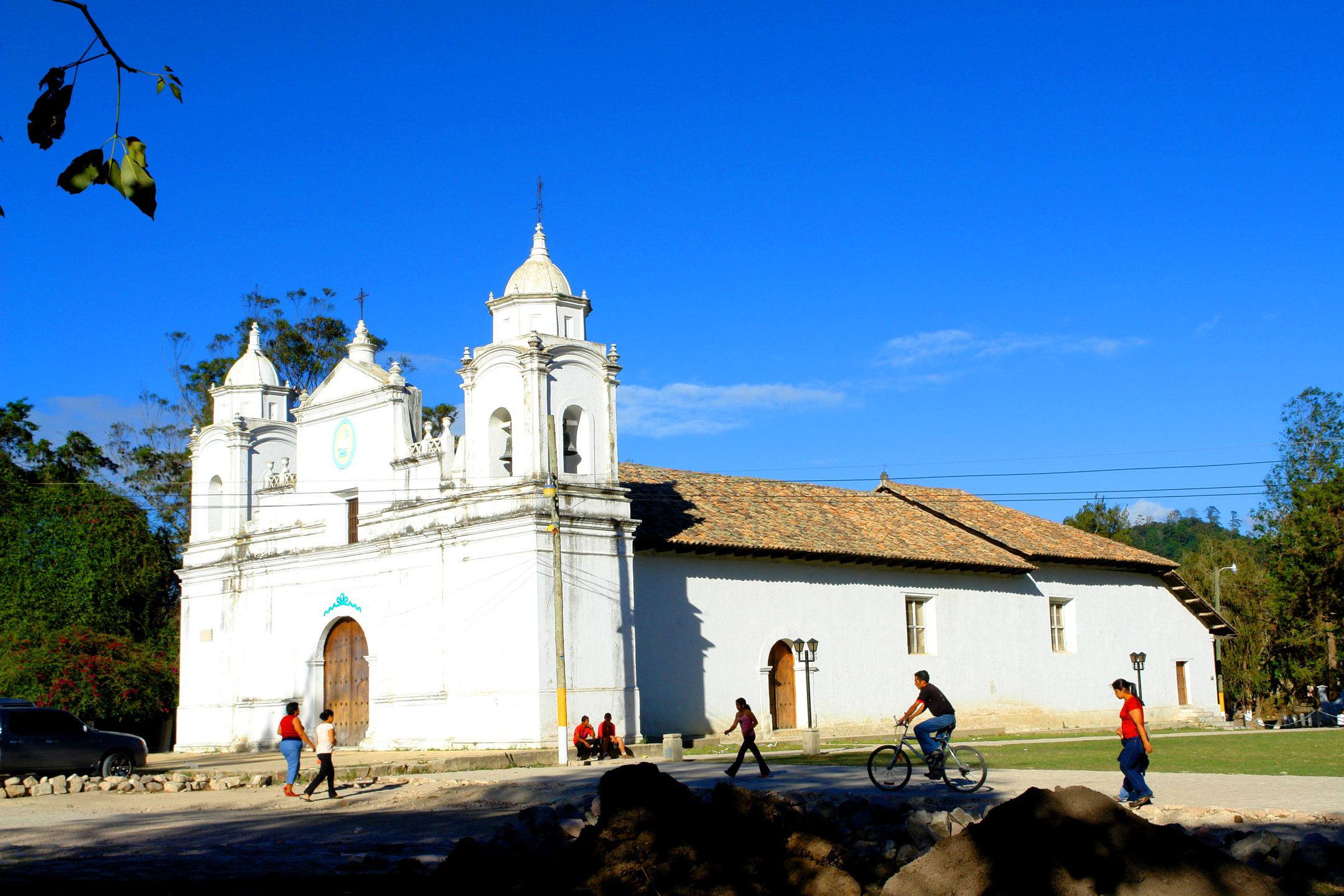
Roman Catholic church of San Juan in Ojojona, Honduras

Both the Roman Catholic Church as well as the Protestant churches, especially the Pentecostal denominations, have experienced growth thanks in large part to modern forms of mass communication in recent decades.

The LDS Church built a temple in Tegucigalpa, Honduras, making it one of the six LDS temples in Central America.

The most prominent evangelical churches in the country include the "Abundant Life", the "Living Love", and the Great Commission Churches. A growing number of evangelical churches have no denominational affiliation. The National Association of Evangelical Pastors represents the evangelical leadership. San Pedro Sula has a mosque and a synagogue, and Tegucigalpa has a synagogue.

== Statistics ==
Religion in Honduras (Gallup CID 2022)
1. Evangelicalism (44.0%)
2. Catholicism (36.0%)

In a 2020 survey, CID-Gallup reported that 48% of the population identifies as evangelical Protestant and 34% as Roman Catholic; Catholic Church officials, however, state that 75% of the population is Catholic.

Local religious leaders state that there are approximately 7,000-11,000 Muslims (mostly Sunni), 1,000 Baha’is and 390 Jews.

== Religious freedom ==
The constitution of Honduras establishes the freedom of religion. The National Congress of Honduras has the power to legally recognize religious groups, which confers to them tax-exempt status and other privileges. The Catholic Church is the only organization legally recognized as a religious group, although other religious groups can register with the government as NGOs. Some religious groups have criticized this as constituting preferential treatment for the Catholic Church at the expense of other groups.

The constitution prohibits religious leaders from holding elected office or publicly making political statements. Despite this, some Protestant pastors have been elected to government positions and serve on government advisory bodies. The government also frequently includes Catholic or Protestant prayers as part of official events and ceremonies, which has been criticized by representatives of other religious groups.

Clergy are provided exemptions from being required to testify in court about information acquired from religious confessions. Vicars, bishops, and archbishops of the Catholic Church, as well as similarly high-ranking members of other religions, are not required to appear in court if subpoenaed, although they are required to make a statement for the court. Public schools do not teach religion but, private schools may include religion on their curricula if they wish.

Foreign missionaries must register with the government. Some religious groups have reached agreements with the government to expedite this process; however, some groups have noted difficulties in obtaining visas for longer than six months.

Conscientious objection to military service is protected by law, including objection on religious grounds. Some politicians, generally from opposition parties, have regularly used antisemitism rhetoric in their political statements. In 2023, the country was scored 4 out of 4 for religious freedom according to Freedom House.

== Main religious groups ==
=== Christianity ===
==== Catholicism ====
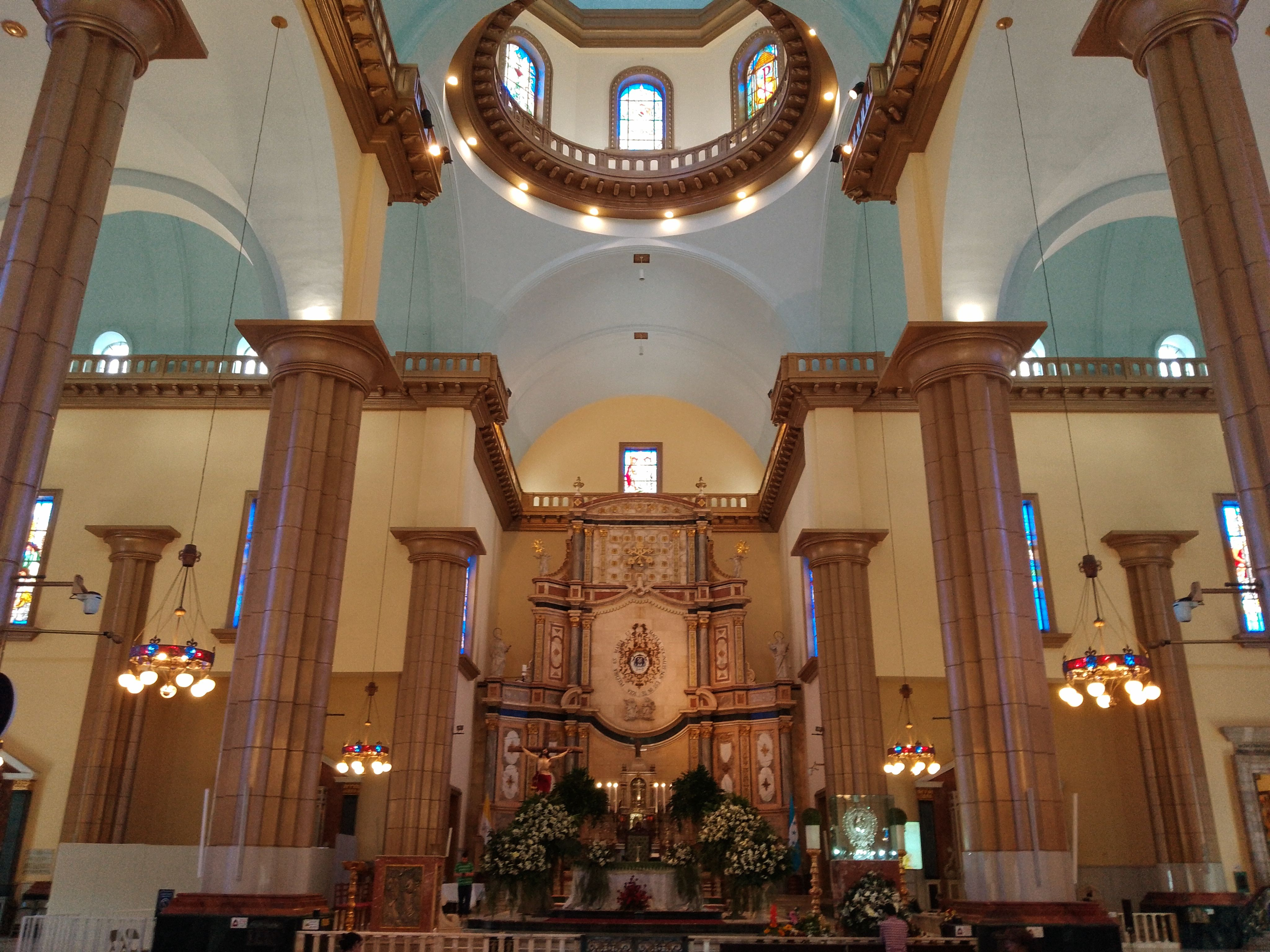
Inside our lady of Suyapa basilica.

The first presecence of Roman Catholicism in Honduras dates from 1502, when the first arrival of Spanish explorers set foot and celebrated the first Catholic mass in continental soil. During the Spanish colonization thousands of indigenous peoples adopted the Catholic faith through the efforts of the missionaries. The adoption of the Catholic faith by the native population caused a syncretism between the tradition of the Roman rite and elements of the local native cultures. Today, the Catholic Church in Honduras is made up of eleven dioceses, namely: Tegucigalpa, Comayagua, Choluteca, Olancho, Yoro, San Pedro Sula, Trujillo, La Ceiba, Gracias, Danlí and Copán, which are part of the Conference Episcopal of Honduras.

In some regions of the country, such as the central-western area of the country, processions are held, especially during Good Thursday and Good Friday. Through these, Hondurans remember the sacrifice of Jesus Christ for humanity. Today, the Catholic are an important part of the native ethnic groups retain their original religion.

==== Protestantism ====
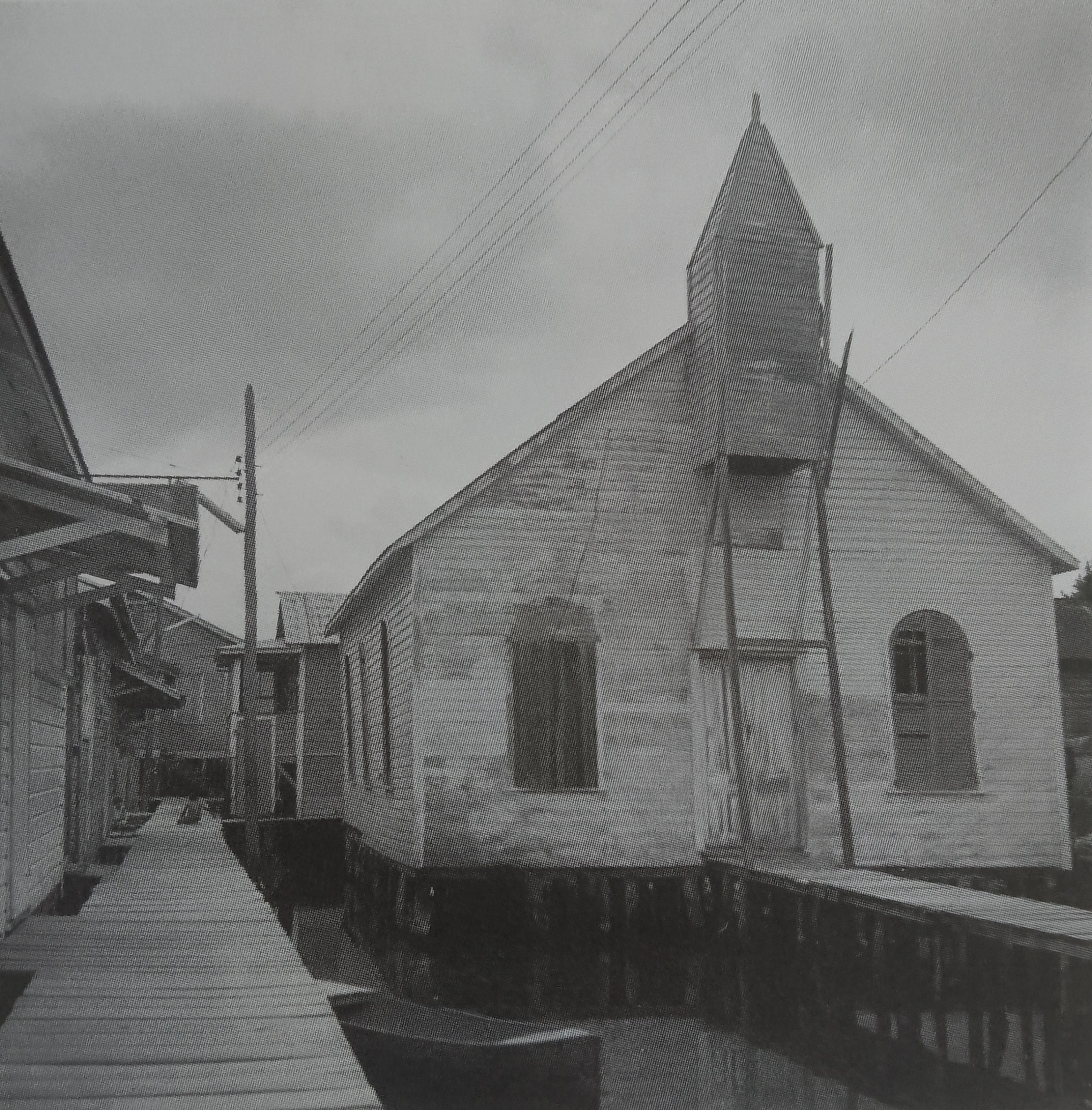
Protestant church in Roatán in 1960.

The Evangelical Church of Honduras, for its part, in the 20th century reached extraordinary numbers, so much so that there was concern on the part of the Catholic authorities. In the year 2000, 23% of the country's population were considered Protestant Christians; today, the latest data from the Government's Directorate of Census and Statistics establishes that evangelical Christianity amounted to 43% of the population of 9,368,926 inhabitants, another curious fact is that the largest number of Churches are not affiliated with any of the large organizations with legal personality, such as the Evangelical Confraternity of Honduras (CEH) which brings together around 22,000 churches.

==== Eastern Orthodoxy ====
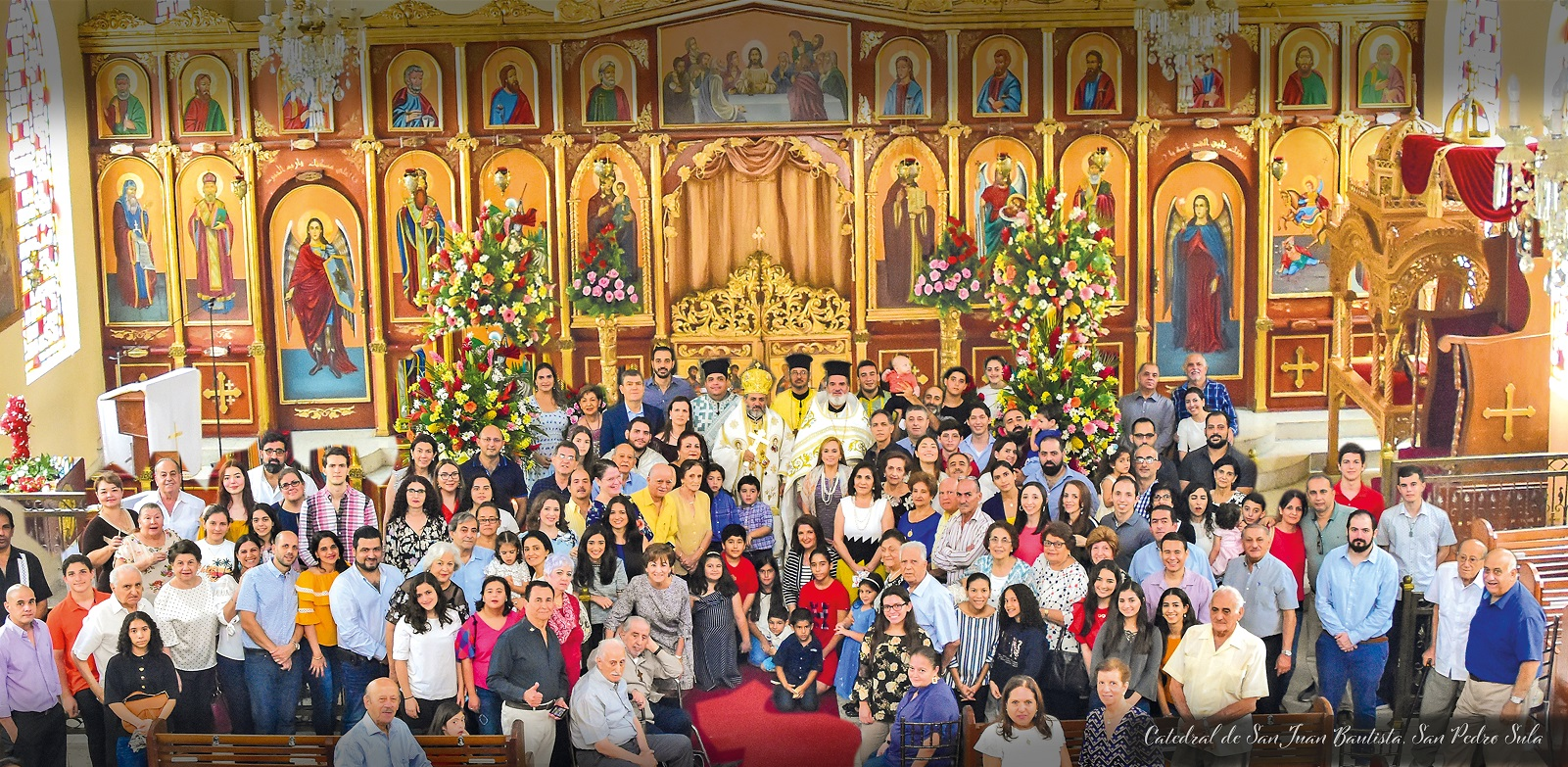
Honduran Orthodox Christians

Another Christian church that has had a relative presence in Honduras is the Orthodox Apostolic Catholic Church, which arrived in the country thanks to the migrations of Arabs to Honduran soil since Orthodoxy is part of the Eastern Catholic churches, of which many Arabs of the rise as the Palestinians have been part of them, taking this branch with them to Honduras.

== Minority faiths ==
=== Judaism ===
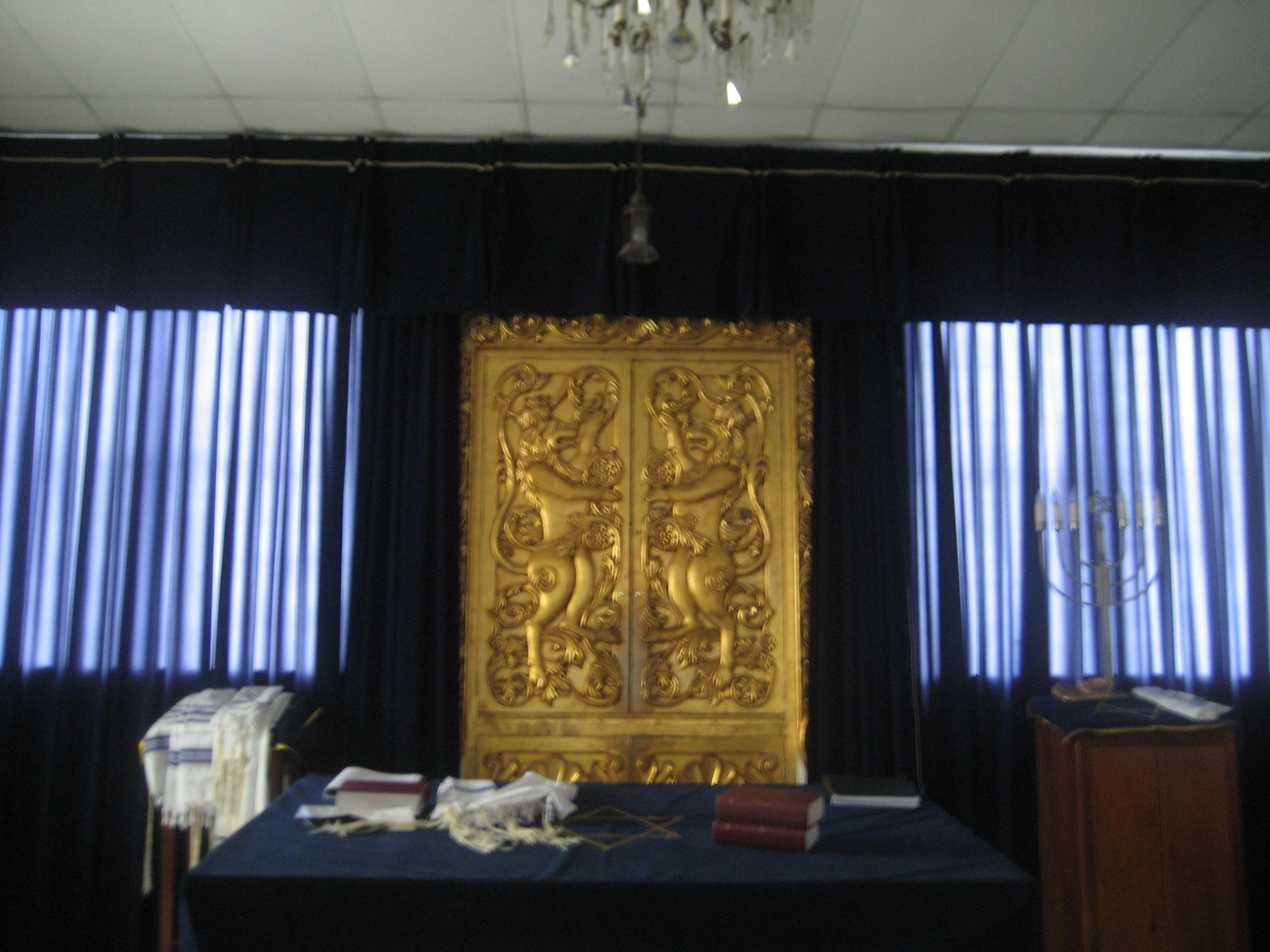
Maguen David Sinagoge

The history of Judaism in Honduras is long-standing. It is recorded that the first Jews were Spanish Sephardic Jews who settled in Santa Barbabra and Comayagua, and despite their apparent conversion to Christianity, they were called "crypto-Jews" since they still secretly practiced some customs of Judaism. With the liberal reform, Jewish migrants from the Russian Empire arrived, many of them left descendants in Honduras, currently there are synagogues in Tegucigalpa, San Pedro Sula, and in Comayagua, the largest branch being Orthodox Judaism.

=== Islam ===
The statistics for Muslims in Honduras estimate population of 11,000 people, representing 0.1 percent of the population of Honduras. Islam comes to Honduras thanks to the migration of Arabs to the country, although the majority of migrants from Palestine or Lebanon were Catholic or Orthodox Christians, some were Muslims, they settled in the main cities of Honduras where they formed their communities.

=== Baháʼísm ===
The Baháʼí Faith in Honduras arrived in the mid-19th century, with Persian migrants escaping from the Pahlavi Iran and then with their flight after the Islamic revolution. They currently have communities in many Honduran departments.

=== Buddhism ===
Buddhism in Honduras has always been a small minority although not absent, it is believed that the first Buddhists in the country were Chinese immigrants, although currently the majority do not practice it. There have been many East Asian people such as Japanese residents who are practicing Buddhists living in the country.

== Atheism ==
About 8% of the population considers itself atheist.

== See also ==
- Virgin of Suyapa, perhaps Honduras' most popular religious image.
- Religion in Latin America
