= Pedro Reyes =

Pedro Reyes may refer to:

- Pedro Reyes (artist) (born 1972), Mexican artist
- Pedro Reyes (comedian) (1961–2015), Spanish comedian and actor
- Pedro Reyes de los Ríos de Lamadrid (1657–1714), Spanish prelate of the Roman Catholic Church
- Pedro Reyes Díaz (1885–?), Chilean electrician and politician
- Pedro Reyes (footballer) (born 1972), Chilean football defender
- Pedro Orlando Reyes (born 1959), Cuban amateur boxer
