= Diocese of Yoro =

Roman Catholic diocese in Honduras

Diocese of Yoro Dioecesis Yorensis
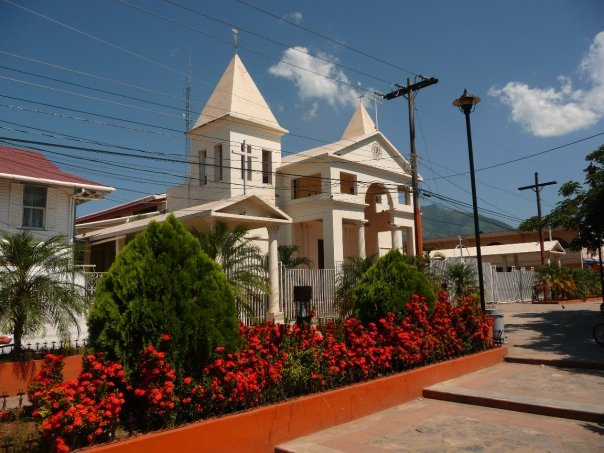
- Cathedral in El Progresso

Location
- Country: Honduras
- Ecclesiastical province: Province of Tegucigalpa

Statistics
- Area: 7,781 km^{2} (3,004 sq mi)
- Population: Total; Catholics: (as of 2010); 546,126; 441,525 (80.8%)
- Parishes: 11

Information
- Denomination: Catholic
- Sui iuris church: Latin Church
- Rite: Roman Rite
- Established: 19 September 2005 (20 years ago)
- Cathedral: Catedral Las Mercedes

Current leadership
- Pope: Leo XIV
- Bishop: Sede Vacante
- Metropolitan Archbishop: Michael Lenihan, O.F.M.
- Apostolic Administrator: Jenrry Johel Velásquez Hernández

Map

The (Roman Catholic) Diocese of Yoro (Latin: Dioecesis Yorensis) covers the department Yoro in Honduras. It is a suffragan diocese of the Archdiocese of San Pedro Sula.

The diocese was erected on 19 September 2005 with territory taken from the archdiocese of Tegucigalpa and was a suffragan of that archdiocese until the erection of the metropolitan province of San Pedro Sula in 2023. Jean-Louis Giasson, P.M.E. was appointed as the first bishop of the diocese. The Cathedral in the city of El Progreso, Yoro.

== History ==
Formerly in the Diocese of Tegucigalpa, Yoro was formed due to the extent of the territory covered, under papal order by Benedict XVI on 18 September 2005. The Canadian priest Juan Luis Giasson, was made Bishop. On the death of Bishop Juan Luis Giasson, Pope Francis appointed Hector David Garcia Osorio as senior official of the diocese on July 3, 2014.

== Parishes ==
The diocese has twelve parishes and 25 priests.

- Our Lady of Mercy, El Progreso.
- San Ignacio de Loyola, El Progreso.
- Our Lady of Suyapa
- San Antonio de Padua, Urraco.
- Santa Rita de Casia, Santa Rita.
- Our Lady of Carmen, El Negrito.
- St. Francis of Assisi, Toyos-The bold.
- Our Lady, Morazán.
- St. Peter the Apostle, Yorito.
- Immaculate Conception, Sulaco-Victoria.
- St. James, Yoro.
- San Jorge Olanchito

.

== Leadership ==
Bishops of Yoro (Roman Rite)

- Bishop Jean-Louis Giasson, P.M.E. (2005 – 2014), resigned
- Bishop David Garcia Hector Osorio (2014 – 2025), appointed Bishop of Santa Rosa de Copán

Apostolic Administrator

- Bishop Jenrry Johel Velásquez Hernández (2025 – Present), Bishop of La Ceiba

== Ordinaries ==
- Jean-Louis Giasson, P.M.E. (2005–2014)
