= Francisco de Zamudio y Avendaño =

Most Reverend Francisco de Zamudio y Avendaño
- Bishop of Nueva Caceres
- Church: Catholic Church
- Diocese: Diocese of Nueva Caceres
- In office: 1628–1639
- Predecessor: Luis de Cañizares
- Successor: Nicolás de Zaldívar y Zapata

Orders
- Consecration: 29 June 1629

Personal details
- Born: 7 January 1570 Portilla, Spanish Empire
- Died: 27 April 1639 (age 69) Nueva Caceres, Captaincy General of the Philippines

Francisco de Zamudio y Avendaño, O.S.A. (7 January 1570 – 27 April 1639) was a Roman Catholic prelate who served as Bishop of Nueva Caceres (1628–1639).

== Biography ==
Francisco de Zamudio y Avendaño was born in Portilla on 7 January 1570 and ordained a priest in the Order of Saint Augustine. On 10 July 1628, he was appointed during the papacy of Pope Urban VIII as Bishop of Nueva Caceres. On 29 June 1629, he was consecrated bishop. He served as Bishop of Nueva Caceres until his death on 10 July 1639.

== External links and additional sources ==
- Cheney, David M. "Archdiocese of Caceres (Nueva Caceres)". Catholic-Hierarchy.org. (for Chronology of Bishops) ^{[self-published]}
- Chow, Gabriel. "Metropolitan Archdiocese of Caceres (Philippines)". GCatholic.org. (for Chronology of Bishops) ^{[self-published]}

Catholic Church titles
Preceded by Luis de Cañizares	Bishop of Nueva Caceres; 1628–1639	Succeeded by Nicolás de Zaldívar y Zapata
