= Our Lady of Suyapa =

Title of the Virgin Mary

Coordinates: 14°4′49.66″N 87°9′27.51″W

Virgin of Suyapa
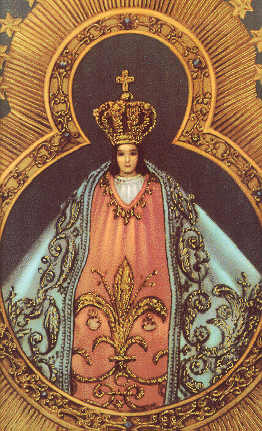

Our Lady of Suyapa Patroness of Honduras
- Venerated in: Roman Catholic Church
- Major shrine: Basilica of the Virgin of Suyapa, Honduras
- Feast: February 3
- Patronage: Honduras, Central America, Orden de los Caballeros de Suyapa

Our Lady of Suyapa (Spanish: Nuestra Señora de Suyapa), also known as the Virgin of Suyapa (Spanish: Virgen de Suyapa), is a Roman Catholic title of the Blessed Virgin Mary from the 18th-century cedar wood statue (6 cm/2.3 in) widely venerated by its devotees.

The statue is kept in the Basílica of Suyapa, Tegucigalpa, Honduras, where many make pilgrimages to visit the statue on February 3, a commemoration of the day she was found in 1747. The statue has been stolen and then recovered on two occasions.

Pope Pius XII issued a Pontifical decree Simulacrum Beatæ Mariæ declaring the namesake title as the Patroness of Honduras on 25 April 1953. Pious devotees funded the construction for a Marian shrine in 1954. Pope John Paul II visited the shrine of the image in 8 March 1983. Pope Benedict XVI approved the request of the Government of Honduras to install a replica image at the Vatican Gardens on 20 September 2013. Pope Francis raised her shrine to the status of Minor Basilica via decree on 28 August 2015.

== Discovery ==
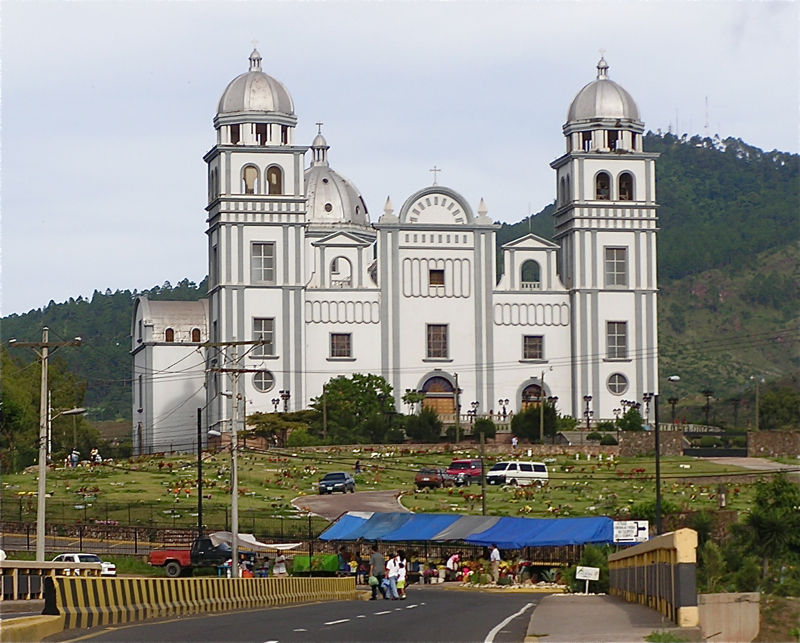
The Basilica of the Virgin of Suyapa.

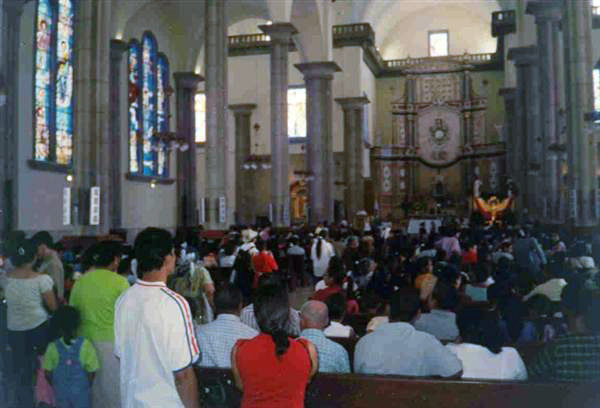
The festival of the Virgin of Suyapa.

There are several different versions of how the statue of the Virgin of Suyapa was discovered.

Many Hondurans believe the statue was miraculously discovered in late January or early February 1747 by a labourer, Alejandro Colindres. Colindres and an 8-year-old boy had been sent by Colindres's mother to clear some cornfields on Piligüin mountain, northeast of Tegucigalpa. On the way back, they were overtaken by nightfall and decided to sleep outside. During the night, Colindres was awakened by a sharp pain in his side, and discovered that he was sleeping on something. Later versions of the story claim that without looking at the object, Colindres threw it as far away as he could, only to find it underneath him as he lay down again. This detail, however, is not present in early versions of the story. The next morning, Colindres discovered that he had been sleeping on a tiny statue of the Blessed Virgin Mary, which he took home with him and set up on the family altar in his mother's house. There it remained for the next 20 years.

By 1777, a chapel was constructed for the statue. The first shrine of our Lady of Suyapa was blessed in 1780. The first notable attested miracle occurred in 1796.

The statue has been stolen twice. In 1986, it was stolen and stripped of its gold, silver, and jewels, and left in the men's room of the restaurant La Terrraza de Don Pepe in Tegucigalpa.

== Description ==
La Morenita (the Dear Dark One) is carved in cedar wood, and measures less than 2.5 inches in size. It is believed that the carving is very old, and possibly done as a devotional item by an unknown, amateur artist. She has an oval face and straight, shoulder length hair. Her hands are joined in prayer and she wears a light pink robe. The statue is covered by a dark cloak trimmed with golden stars and adorned with valuable jewels.

== Veneration ==
In 1953, Pope Pius XII declared her Patroness of Honduras under the namesake title, and selected February 3 as her feast day. In 1954, a large Marian shrine was built next to the chapel. The statue of the Virgin spends most of its time in the chapel, but every year before the celebration of her festival, the statue is moved into the larger church to accommodate the crowds.

The statue is considered to have miraculous powers. The swift ending of the Football War between Honduras and El Salvador is attributed to the statue. Many of the Honduran soldiers involved reported visions of the Virgin, which calmed their fears during the fighting. In 1969, the namesake was declared Captain General of the Armed Forces of Honduras. Pope John Paul II visited her shrine on the 30th anniversary in 1983. Pope Francis raised the shrine to the status of Minor Basilica in 2015.

The statue of the Virgin of Suyapa has a group of lay caretakers, all male, known as the Orden de los Caballeros de Suyapa, founded in the 20th century. They are responsible for caring for the image, and the small chapel. They escort the statue whenever it leaves the chapel to travel around Honduras, as it often does every February.

== See also ==
- Religion in Honduras

== Sources ==
- Barceló Morey, Jose. 2000. La Inmaculada Concepción de María en Honduras: La Inmaculada Concepción de Suyapa, Patrona de Honduras. San Pedro Sula: Editorial/Librería Coello
- Valladares B., Juan R. 1946. La Virgen de Suyapa (historia documentada). Tegucigalpa: Tallereres Tipo-Lito.
