= Jean-Louis Giasson =

Canadian Roman Catholic bishop

Jean-Louis Giasson P.M.E.
- Bishop of Yoro
- Archdiocese: Tegucigalpa
- See: Tegucigalpa
- Appointed: 19 September 2005
- In office: 2005-2014
- Predecessor: None
- Successor: TBD

Orders
- Ordination: 18 December 1965

Personal details
- Born: December 7, 1939 L'Islet, Quebec, Canada
- Died: February 12, 2014 (aged 74) Yoro, Honduras
- Denomination: Roman Catholic
- Residence: Yoro, Honduras

Jean-Louis Giasson P.M.E. (December 7, 1939 – February 12, 2014) was a Canadian Roman Catholic bishop.

Born in L'Islet-sur-Mer, Quebec, Canada, Giasson was ordained to the priesthood in 1965 with the Society of Foreign Missions of Quebec in Laval, Quebec. Following his ordination, Giasson went to Honduras as a missionary in 1966 and in 2003 he became regional superior for the Society in Honduras.

== Bishop of Yoro ==
In 2005 after 48 years as a priest, he was appointed by Pope Benedict XVI the first bishop of the Roman Catholic Diocese of Yoro, Honduras. He resigned on January 21, 2014 and died less than a month after retiring.
