= Geraldo Scarpone Caporale =

Geraldo Scarpone Caporale O.F.M.
- Bishop of Comayagua
- Church: Catholic Church
- Diocese: Diocese of Comayagua
- In office: 30 May 1979 – 21 May 2004
- Predecessor: Bernardino Nicola Mazzarella
- Successor: Robert Camilleri Azzopardi
- Previous post: Coadjutor Bishop of Comayagua (1979)

Orders
- Ordination: 24 June 1956 by James Henry Ambrose Griffiths
- Consecration: 21 February 1979 by Gabriel Montalvo Higuera

Personal details
- Born: Geraldo Daniel Joseph Scarpone Caporale; October 1, 1928 Watertown, Massachusetts, United States
- Died: October 29, 2016 (aged 88)

Bishop Geraldo Daniel Joseph Scarpone Caporale, O.F.M. (October 1, 1928 – October 29, 2016) was an American-born Honduran Roman Catholic bishop.

Ordained to the priesthood in 1956 by Bishop James Griffiths and consecrated to the episcopacy in 1979 by Archbishop Gabriel Montalvo Higuera, Bishop Scarpone served as Coadjutor Bishop of the Roman Catholic Diocese of Comayagua, Honduras, from January 1979 and in May of the same year he became Diocesan Bishop until his retirement in 2004.

Bishop Scarpone became directly involved with the Servants of the Holy Family (S.S.F.), a traditional Catholic institute under the headship of Bishop Anthony D. Ward and located in Colorado Springs, Colorado. According to Fr. Michael McMahon, Scarpone privately administered priestly ordinations to members of the S.S.F. in 1995, giving faculties for the Sacrament of Reconciliation (claimed by the S.S.F. to have been given “usque ad revocationem”) and incorporating these priests into his diocese. In 2003, a cardinal of the Church requested then-Father Ward to share the name of the 1995 ordaining bishop. Upon receiving permission from Scarpone, Ward released his name to the cardinal.
