= Martín de Espinosa y Monzón =

17th-century Catholic bishop

Most Reverend Martín de Espinosa y Monzó
- Bishop of Comayagua
- Church: Catholic Church
- Diocese: Diocese of Comayagua
- In office: 1672–1676
- Predecessor: Juan Merlo de la Fuente
- Successor: Ildefonso Vargas y Abarca

Orders
- Consecration: 1673 by Francisco Antonio Sarmiento de Luna y Enríquez

Personal details
- Born: 1614 Valladolid, Mexico
- Died: 1676 (aged 62) Comayagua, Honduras

Martín de Espinosa y Monzó (1614–1676) was a Roman Catholic prelate who served as Bishop of Comayagua (1672–1676).

== Biography ==
Martín de Espinosa y Monzó was born in Valladolid (now Morelia), Mexico in 1614. On 12 September 1672, he was appointed during the papacy of Pope Clement X as Bishop of Comayagua. In 1673, he was consecrated as a bishop by Francisco Antonio Sarmiento de Luna y Enríquez, Bishop of Michoacán. He served as Bishop of Comayagua until his death in 1676.

== External links and additional sources ==
- Cheney, David M. "Archdiocese of Tegucigalpa". Catholic-Hierarchy.org. (for Chronology of Bishops) ^{[self-published]}
- Chow, Gabriel. "Diocese of Comayagua (Honduras)". GCatholic.org. (for Chronology of Bishops) ^{[self-published]}

Catholic Church titles
Preceded by Juan Merlo de la Fuente	Bishop of Comayagua; 1672–1676	Succeeded by Ildefonso Vargas y Abarca
