= Santa Maria della Speranza =

- Our Lady of Hope (in English); S. Mariæ de Spe (in Latin)
- Click on the map for a fullscreen view
- 41°57′32″N 12°31′18″E
- Location: Via Francesco Cocco Ortu 19, Rome
- Country: Italy
- Denomination: Roman Catholic
- Tradition: Roman Rite
- Website: Official website, unsafe

History
- Status: Titular church
- Dedication: Mary, mother of Jesus (as Our Lady of Hope)
- Consecrated: 1995

Architecture
- Architectural type: Church
- Groundbreaking: 1988
- Completed: 1995

Administration
- District: Lazio
- Province: Rome

The church of Santa Maria della Speranza is a church in Rome, in Nuovo Salario district, in Piazza A. Fradeletto.

The laying of the sacred stone of the building took place in 1988; the construction work was completed in 1995, and on December 10 of that year the new church was consecrated by Cardinal Vicar Camillo Ruini.

The church is the home of the parish, established in 1968 by decree of the Cardinal Vicar Angelo Dell'Acqua Neminem fugit, and entrusted to the Salesians: before the construction of the new church, parish activities were taking place in the neighboring Salesian Pontifical University. It deserves to be mentioned this curious fact: in 1970 Pope Paul VI visited the parish; in his speech greeted Cardinal Karol Wojtyla (the future Pope John Paul II) present among the bystanders; and in turn, the Pope was welcomed by the then professor of nearby Salesian University, the future Secretary of State Cardinal Tarcisio Bertone. John Paul II visited the church again in 1997.

The church is home to the cardinal title of Our Lady of Hope.

== Cardinal-Priests ==
- Cardinal Óscar Andrés Rodríguez Maradiaga, S.D.B. (21 Februari 2001 - present)
