= Nicolás de Zaldívar y Zapata =

Most Reverend Nicolás de Zaldívar y Zapata
- Bishop Elect of Nueva Caceres
- Church: Catholic Church
- Diocese: Diocese of Nueva Caceres
- In office: 1644–1646
- Predecessor: Francisco de Zamudio y Avendaño
- Successor: Antonio de San Gregorio

Personal details
- Died: 1646

Nicolás de Zaldívar y Zapata, O.S.A. (died 1646) was a Roman Catholic prelate who was appointed as Bishop of Nueva Caceres (1644–1646).

== Biography ==
Nicolás de Zaldívar y Zapata was ordained a priest in the Order of Saint Augustine. On 2 May 1644, he was appointed during the papacy of Pope Urban VIII as Bishop of Nueva Caceres. He died before he was consecrated in 1646.

== External links and additional sources ==
- Cheney, David M. "Archdiocese of Caceres (Nueva Caceres)". Catholic-Hierarchy.org. (for Chronology of Bishops) ^{[self-published]}
- Chow, Gabriel. "Metropolitan Archdiocese of Caceres (Philippines)". GCatholic.org. (for Chronology of Bishops) ^{[self-published]}

Catholic Church titles
Preceded by Francisco de Zamudio y Avendaño	Bishop Elect of Nueva Caceres; 1644–1646	Succeeded by Antonio de San Gregorio
