= Michael Lenihan =

Irish Roman Catholic bishop

The Right Reverend Michael Lenihan O.F.M.
- Archbishop of San Pedro Sula
- Archdiocese: San Pedro Sula

Orders
- Ordination: 12 July 1980
- Consecration: 11 February 2012 by Oscar Andrés Cardinal Rodríguez Maradiaga, S.D.B.

Personal details
- Born: 22 September 1951 (age 75) Abbeyfeale, Ireland
- Denomination: Roman Catholic
- Motto: De espadas a arados (Swords into ploughshares)

Michael Lenihan, O.F.M. (born 22 September 1951) is the Archbishop of San Pedro Sula. He previously served as the first Bishop of La Ceiba from 2012 to 2023 and as the vicar general of and a parish priest in the Diocese of Comayagua. He is a member of the Order of Friars Minor.

== Biography ==
Lenihan was born in 1951 in Abbeyfeale, County Limerick, in Ireland. After the primary and secondary studies, he entered the Franciscan novitiate in Killarney Franciscan Friary in 1972, and then studied philosophy at the National University of Galway from 1973-1976. He went on to study theology in Rome at the Pontifical University of Saint Thomas Aquinas, Angelicum (1976–1979), and then at the Pontifical Gregorian University (1979–1980).

Lenihan made his solemn profession of religious vows in the Order Friars Minor on 17 September 1977 and was ordained a priest on 12 July 1980. He belongs to the Franciscan Province of the Friars Minor of Central America and Panama.

After ordination, Lenihan held the following positions: 1980-1982: Director of the Spiritual Board of Multyfarnham, Ireland, 1982-1984: Vicar of the Convent, Wesford, Ireland, 1984-1989: Parish Vicar of the Parish of St. Francis in Gotera, Morazán, Diocese of San Miguel, El Salvador, 1989-1997: Guardian and Parish Priest of the Parish of St. Francis in Gotera, Morazán, Diocese of San Miguel, El Salvador, 1997-2000: Parish Vicar and Guardian, La Palma, Chalatenango, El Salvador, 2000-2009: Guardian and Parish Priest of the Parish of Santos Martires, Comayagua, Honduras, 2004-2008: Provincial Councilor of the Region of Honduras, 2001-2009: Vicar General of the Diocese of Comayagua; 2009-2011: Guardian of the Fraternity of St. Bonaventure Provincial of the Friars Minor of the Curia and Vicar of the Parish of Parish Inmaculada Corazón de María, Guatemala.

Lenihan was raised to the episcopate on 11 February 2012 by Oscar Andrés Cardinal Rodríguez Maradiaga, S.D.B.
