= Roman Catholic Diocese of Danlí =

Roman Catholic diocese in Honduras

Diocese of Danlí Dioecesis Danliensis

Location
- Country: Honduras
- Ecclesiastical province: Province of Tegucigalpa

Statistics
- Area: 7,489 km^{2} (2,892 sq mi)
- Population: Total; Catholics: (as of 2020); 502,944; 415,480 (82.6%)
- Parishes: 11

Information
- Denomination: Catholic
- Sui iuris church: Latin Church
- Rite: Roman Rite
- Established: 02 January 2017 (9 years ago)
- Cathedral: Catedral de la Inmaculata Concepción

Current leadership
- Pope: Leo XIV
- Bishop: Patricio Larrosa Martos
- Metropolitan Archbishop: José Vicente Nácher Tatay
- Bishops emeritus: José Antonio Canales Motiño

Map

The Roman Catholic Diocese of Danlí is a Latin suffragan bishopric in the ecclesiastical province (covering all Honduras) of the Metropolitan Archbishop of Tegucigalpa, with see at Danlí, in southern Honduras's El Paraíso department (but not its capital).

Its cathedral episcopal is the Catedral de la Inmaculata Concepción, devoted to the Immaculate Conception, in Danlí.

== History ==
The diocese was erected on 2 January 2017 by Pope Francis, on Honduran territory split off from that of its Metropolitan mother see, the Archdiocese of Tegucigalpa. It was immediately subject to the Roman Congregation for Bishops, without a (semi-)missionary stage. Its first ordinary was José Antonio Canales Motiño, appointed on 2 January 2017.

== Episcopal ordinaries ==
- José Antonio Canales Motiño (2 January 2017 – 10 October 2025, resigned)
- Teodoro Gómez Rivera (10 October 2025 – 25 July 2026), Apostolic Administrator
- Patricio Larrosa Martos (since 15 May 2026)

== See also ==
- List of Catholic dioceses in Honduras

== Sources and external links ==
- GCatholic - data for all sections
