= Walter Guillén Soto =

Honduran Catholic bishop

His Excellency, Most Reverend, Monsignor Walter Guillén Soto S.D.B.
- Bishop of Gracias
- Church: Catholic
- Diocese: Gracias
- Appointed: 27 April 2021
- Installed: 11 June 2021
- Predecessor: none
- Previous posts: • Auxiliary Bishop of Tegucigalpa • Titular Bishop of Nasbinca • Private secretary of archbishop of Tegucigalpa • Rector of the "San Juan Bosco Shrine" of Tegucigalpa • General chaplain of the Catholic University of Honduras

Orders
- Ordination: 5 November 1988

Personal details
- Born: 6 December 1961 (age 64) San Pedro Sula, Honduras
- Education: Universidad Francisco Marroquín; Universidad Don Bosco; University of Santiago de Compostela
- Motto: Latin: Sub tuum praesidium confugimus (We take refuge under your protection)

Styles of Walter Guillén Soto
- Reference style: The Most Reverend
- Spoken style: Your Excellency
- Religious style: Monsignor
- Posthumous style: none

Mons. Walter Guillén Soto (6 December 1961) is a Honduran prelate of the Catholic Church and a member of the Salesians of Don Bosco who has been the Bishop of Gracias in Honduras since 2021.

== Biography ==
Walter Guillén Soto was born in San Pedro Sula on 1961 and on 5 November 1988 he was ordained a Salesian priest.

On 14 November 2020, Pope Francis appointed him auxiliary bishop of Tegucigalpa and titular bishop of Nasbinca. On 27 April 2021, before Soto received his episcopal ordination, Pope Francis named him the first bishop of the Diocese of Gracias, which was established that same day.

Guillén received his episcopal consecration on 11 June 2021 from Archbishop Gábor Pintér, Apostolic Nuncio to Honduras.

Catholic Church titles
| New title | Bishop of Gracias; 27 April 2021–present | Incumbent |
