= Diocese of Choluteca =

Latin Catholic diocese in Honduras

Diocese of Choluteca Dioecesis Cholutecensis

Catholic

Location
- Country: Honduras
- Ecclesiastical province: Province of Tegucigalpa
- Metropolitan: José Vicente Nácher Tatay, CM
- Coordinates: 13°18′23″N 87°11′42″W

Statistics
- Area: 6,282 km^{2} (2,425 sq mi)
- Population: Total; Catholics: (as of 2021); 726,250 (Note: Annuario Pontificio (2022) via Catholic-Hierarchy.org); 544,370 (75%)
- Parishes: 16

Information
- Denomination: Catholic Church
- Sui iuris church: Latin Church
- Rite: Roman Rite
- Established: 8 September 1964 (62 years ago)
- Cathedral: Catedral de la Inmaculada Concepción (Cathedral of the Immaculate Conception), Choluteca
- Secular priests: 32 (30 diocesan; 2 religious)

Current leadership
- Pope: Leo XIV
- Bishop: vacant
- Metropolitan Archbishop: Jose Vicente Nacher Tatay
- Bishops emeritus: Guy Charbonneau

Map

The Diocese of Choluteca (erected 8 September 1964, as the Territorial Prelature of Choluteca) is a Latin Catholic diocese in Honduras. It is a suffragan diocese of the Archdiocese of Tegucigalpa. Choluteca was elevated to a diocese on 29 August 1979.

== Bishops ==
=== Ordinaries ===
- Marcel Gérin y Boulay, P.M.E. (1964–1984)
- Raúl Corriveau, P.M.E. (1984–2005) – Bishop Emeritus
- Guido Plante, P.M.E. (2005–2012)
- Guy Charbonneau, P.M.E. (2013–2023)
- Teodoro Gómez Rivera (2023–2026)

=== Coadjutor bishops ===
- Raúl Corriveau, P.M.E. (1980–1984)
- Guido Plante, P.M.E. (2004–2005)

== See also ==
- Catholic Church in Honduras
- List of Roman Catholic dioceses in Honduras
