= Society of Foreign Missions of Quebec =

Roman Catholic society of apostolic life

- Societas pro missionibus exteris Provinciæ Quebecensis (Latin)
- Abbreviation: P.M.E. (post-nominal letters)
- Formation: February 2, 1921; 105 years ago
- Founded at: Quebec, Canada
- Type: Society of Apostolic Life of Pontifical Right for men
- Headquarters: 180 place Juge-Desnoyers, Pont-Viau, Ville de Laval, QC H7G IA4, Canada
- Coordinates: 41°54′4.9″N 12°27′38.2″E
- Region served: Latin America and the Far East
- Members: 95 members (includes 90 priests) as of 2020
- Motto: Latin: English:
- Superior General: Fr. Roland Laneuville, P.M.E.
- Ministry: Evangelization of Peoples
- Parent organization: Roman Catholic Church

The Society of Foreign Missions of Quebec (French: Société des Missions-Étrangères du Québec) is a missionary Roman Catholic Society of Apostolic Life of Pontifical Right for men. It is devoted to missions mainly in Latin America and the Far East. It was founded in 1921 in Quebec, Canada. Members add the nominal letters P.M.E. after their names to indicate membership in the Congregation.

== History ==
The society was established on 2 February 1921 in Quebec, Canada, where it still has its headquarters: 180 place Juge-Desnoyers, Pont-Viau, Ville de Laval, QC H7G IA4, Canada.

== Statistics ==
As of 2020, it has 8 houses and 95 members, including 90 priests.

== Superiors general ==
- Fr. Jean-Avila Roch (1932.08.16 – 1938.07.11)
- Fr. Edgar Larochelle (藍德) (1938.07.11 – 1958.02.19)
- Fr. Joseph Gilles Napoléon Ouellet (1958.02.19 – 1967.09.19) (later Archbishop, see below)
- Fr. Viateur Allary (1967.09.19 – 1973.07.05)
- Fr. André Vallée (1973.07.05 – 1979.06.05) (later Bishop, see below)
- Fr. Jean-Louis Martin (1979.06.05 – 1985.05.28)
- Fr. Pierre Samson (1985.05.28 – 1991.05.28)
- Fr. François Lapierre (1991.05.28 – 1998.04.07) (later Bishop, see below)
- Fr. Roland Laneuville (1998 – 2008.04.28)
- Fr. Guy Charbonneau (2008.04.28 – 2013.01.26) (later Bishop, see below)
- Fr. Martin Laliberté, P.M.E. (2013.05.08 – ...)

== Prelates from their ranks ==
Alive

- Bishop Guy Charbonneau, Bishop of Choluteca (Honduras)
- Raúl Corriveau, Bishop emeritus of Choluteca (Honduras)
- François Lapierre, Bishop of Saint-Hyacinthe (Canada)
- Juan Luis Martin Buisson, Titular Bishop of Aquæ in Numidia and Apostolic Vicar emeritus of Pucallpa (Peru)

Deceased, by year of demise

- 1943: Fr. Joseph-Albany-Emilien Massé (馬), Apostolic Prefect of Lindong 林東 (PR China)
- 1952: Bishop Joseph-Louis-Adhémar Lapierre (石俊聲), Bishop of Siping 四平 (PR China)
- 1962: Fr. Adam Grossi, Apostolic Prefect of Malda (India) (March 28, 1952 – 1962)
- 1975: Archbishop Clovis Thibauld, Metropolitan Archbishop emeritus of Davao (Philippines)
- 1995: Bishop Pierre Fisette, Bishop of Hearst (Canada)
- 1997: Bishop Marcel Gérin y Boulay, Bishop emeritus of Choluteca (Honduras)
- 2005: Bishop Joseph-Rolland-Gustave Prévost-Godard (趙玉明), Apostolic Vicar emeritus of Pucallpa (Peru)
- 2007: Bishop Generoso C. Camiña, Bishop emeritus of Digos (Philippines)
- 2009: Archbishop Gilles Ouellet, Metropolitan Archbishop emeritus of Rimouski (Canada)
- 2014: Bishop Jean-Louis Giasson, Bishop emeritus of Yoro (Honduras)
- 2015: Bishop André Vallée, Bishop emeritus of Hearst (Canada)
- 2015: Bishop Guido Plante, Bishop emeritus of Choluteca (Honduras)

== See also ==
- At the Crossroads (À la croisée des chemins), a 1942 film produced by the Société

== Sources and external links ==
- Society website
- GigaCatholic, with biography links
