= Fernando Cardiñanos =

Spanish clergyman

Fernando Cardiñanos O.F.M. Obs. (born 29 May 1731 in Vitoria-Gasteiz – July 1794) was a Spanish clergyman and bishop for the Roman Catholic Diocese of Comayagua. He was consecrated and appointed bishop in 1788. He died in July 1794, at the age of 63.
