= Ildefonso Vargas y Abarca =

17th-century Catholic bishop

Most Reverend Ildefonso Vargas y Abarca
- Bishop of Comayagua
- Church: Catholic Church
- Diocese: Diocese of Comayagua
- In office: 1677–1697
- Predecessor: Martín de Espinosa y Monzón
- Successor: Pedro Reyes de los Ríos de Lamadrid

Orders
- Ordination: 23 September 1656
- Consecration: 24 February 1679 by Andrés de las Navas y Quevedo

Personal details
- Born: April 1633 Toledo, Spain
- Died: 9 May 1697 (age 64) Comayagua, Honduras

Ildefonso Vargas y Abarca, O.E.S.A. or Alonso Vargas y Abarca (1633 – 9 May 1697) was a Roman Catholic prelate who served as Bishop of Comayagua (1677–1697).

== Biography ==
Ildefonso Vargas y Abarca was born in Toledo, Spain, in April 1633 and ordained a priest in the Order of Hermits of Saint Augustine on 23 September 1656. On 22 November 1677, he was appointed during the papacy of Pope Innocent XI as Bishop of Comayagua. On 24 February 1679, he was consecrated bishop by Andrés de las Navas y Quevedo, Bishop of Nicaragua. He served as Bishop of Comayagua until his death on 9 May 1697.

== External links and additional sources ==
- Cheney, David M. "Archdiocese of Tegucigalpa". Catholic-Hierarchy.org. (for Chronology of Bishops) ^{[self-published]}
- Chow, Gabriel. "Diocese of Comayagua (Honduras)". GCatholic.org. (for Chronology of Bishops) ^{[self-published]}

Catholic Church titles
| Preceded by Martín de Espinosa y Monzón | Bishop of Comayagua; 1677–1697 | Succeeded by Pedro Reyes de los Ríos de Lamadrid |
