= Antonio López Portillo de Guadalupe =

Roman-catholic bishop

Antonio López Portillo de Guadalupe O.F.M. (born 11 May 1679 in Guadalajara – 6 January 1742) was a Mexican clergyman and bishop for the Roman Catholic Diocese of Comayagua. He became ordained in 1727. He was appointed bishop in 1725. He died on 6 January 1742, at the age of 62.
