= Alfonso de Talavera =

Most Reverend Alfonso de Talavera
- Bishop of Comayagua
- Church: Catholic Church
- Diocese: Diocese of Comayagua
- In office: 1531–1540
- Predecessor: None
- Successor: Cristóbal de Pedraza

Alfonso de Talavera, O.S.H. or Alfonso de Guzman was a Roman Catholic prelate who served as the first Bishop of Comayagua (1531–1540).

== Biography ==
Alfonso de Talavera was ordained a priest in the Order of Saint Jerome. In September 1531, he was appointed during the papacy of Pope Clement VII as Bishop of Comayagua. He served as Bishop of Comayagua until his resignation in 1540.

== External links and additional sources ==
- Cheney, David M. "Archdiocese of Tegucigalpa". Catholic-Hierarchy.org. (for Chronology of Bishops) ^{[self-published]}
- Chow, Gabriel. "Diocese of Comayagua (Honduras)". GCatholic.org. (for Chronology of Bishops) ^{[self-published]}

Catholic Church titles
Preceded by None	Bishop of Comayagua; 1531–1540	Succeeded by Cristóbal de Pedraza
