= Alfonso del Galdo =

Roman-catholic bishop

Alfonso del Galdo (born 1550 in Medina del Campo) was a Spanish clergyman and bishop for the Roman Catholic Archdiocese of Tegucigalpa. He was ordained in 1612. He was appointed bishop in 1613. He died in 1629.
