= Archdiocese of Tegucigalpa =

Latin Catholic archdiocese in Honduras

Coordinates: 14.1055°N 87.2042°W

Archdiocese of Tegucigalpa Archidioecesis Tegucigalpensis La arquidiócesis de Tegucigalpa

Catholic
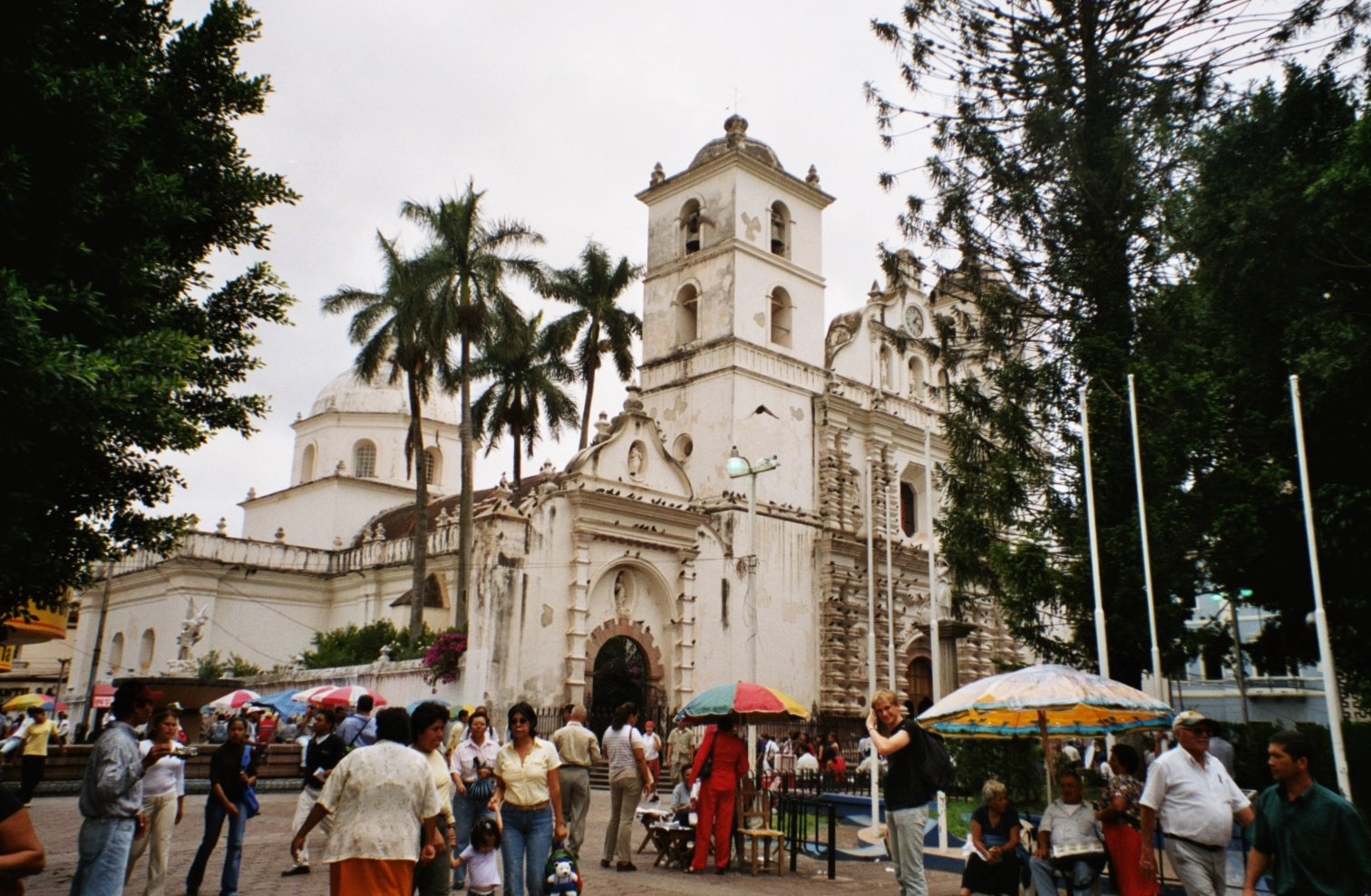
- Catedral Metropolitana de San Miguel de Arcángel

Location
- Country: Honduras
- Ecclesiastical province: Tegucigalpa

Statistics
- Area: 15,167 km^{2} (5,856 sq mi)
- Population: Total; Catholics: (as of 2010); 1,801,000; 1,550,000 (86.1%)
- Parishes: 56

Information
- Denomination: Catholic Church
- Sui iuris church: Latin Church
- Rite: Roman Rite
- Established: 1561 (465 years ago)
- Cathedral: Cathedral of St. Michael the Archangel

Current leadership
- Pope: Leo XIV
- Archbishop: José Vicente Nácher Tatay
- Bishops emeritus: Óscar Rodríguez Maradiaga; Juan José Pineda Fasquelle

Map

The Archdiocese of Tegucigalpa (Spanish: La arquidiócesis de Tegucigalpa) (1916 established, successor to the Diocese of Comayagua, erected 1561) is a Latin Church ecclesiastical territory or archdiocese of the Catholic Church in Honduras. Until 2023, it was the only metropolitan see in Honduras, with its ecclesiastical province covering the whole country.

Its archepiscopal see is the Cathedral of St. Michael Archangel in the national capital, Tegucigalpa. It also has a minor basilica which serves as a national shrine, the Basilica of Suyapa, also in Tegucigalpa.

== Statistics ==
As per 2014, it pastorally served 1,684,000 Catholics (86.1% of 1,955,000 total per 2014) in 58 parishes and 3 missions with 156 priests (79 diocesan, 77 religious), 1 deacon, 417 lay religious (97 brothers, 320 sisters) and 37 seminarians.

== Ecclesiastical province of Tegucigalpa ==
Its suffragan sees are:

- Roman Catholic Diocese of Choluteca
- Roman Catholic Diocese of Comayagua
- Roman Catholic Diocese of Danlí
- Roman Catholic Diocese of Juticalpa

== History ==
- It was established on 2 February 1916 as the Metropolitan Archdiocese of Tegucigalpa, on territory split off from the suppressed Diocese of Comayagua, the rest of which formed the Apostolic Vicariate of San Pedro Sula and Diocese of Santa Rosa de Copán.
- Lost territories on several occasions: on 1949.03.06 to establish the Territorial Prelature of Inmaculada Concepción de la B.V.M. en Olancho (which later became the Diocese of Juticalpa), on 1963.03.13 to (re)establish the Diocese of Comayagua, on 1964.09.08 to establish the Territorial Prelature of Choluteca, on 2005.09.19 to establish Diocese of Yoro and on 2017.01.02 to establish the Diocese of Danlí.

== Bishops ==
Bishops of Comayagua

1. Alfonso de Talavera, OSH (1531–1540)
2. Cristóbal de Pedraza (1539–1553)
3. Jerónimo de Corella, OSH (1556–1575)
4. Alfonso de la Cerda, OP (1578–1587), appointed Bishop of La Plata o Charcas
5. Gaspar de Andrada, OFM (1587–1612)
6. Alfonso del Galdo, OP (1612–1628)
7. Luis de Cañizares, OFM (1628–1645)
8. Juan Merlo de la Fuente (1650–1656)
9. Martín de Espinosa y Monzón (1672–1676)
10. Ildefonso Vargas y Abarca, OSA (1678–1699)
11. Pedro Reyes de los Ríos de Lamadrid, OSB (1699–1700), appointed Bishop of Yucatán (Mérida)
12. Juan Pérez Carpintero, OPraem (1701–1724)
13. Antonio López Portillo de Guadalupe, OFM (1725–1742)
14. Francisco de Molina, OSBas (1743–1749)
15. Diego Rodríguez de Rivas y Velasco (1751–1762), appointed Bishop of Guadalajara, Jalisco, Mexico
16. Isidro Rodríguez Lorenzo, OSBas (1764–1767), appointed Archbishop of Santo Domingo
17. Antonio Macarulla Minguilla de Aguilain (1767–1772), appointed Bishop of Durango
18. Francisco José de Palencia (1773–1775)
19. Francisco Antonio Iglesia Cajiga, OSH (1777–1783), appointed Bishop of Michoacán
20. José Antonio de Isabela (1785–1785)
21. Fernando Cardiñanos, OFM (1788–1794)
22. Vicente Navas, OP (1795–1809)
23. Manuel Julián Rodríguez del Barranco (1817–1819)
24. Francisco de Paula Campo y Pérez (1844–1853)
25. Hipólito Casiano Flórez (1854–1857)
26. Juan Félix de Jesús Zepeda (1861–1885)
27. Manuel Francisco Vélez (1887–1901)
28. José María Martínez y Cabañas (1902 – 2 February 1916)

Archbishops of Tegucigalpa

1. José María Martínez y Cabañas (2 February 1916 – 11 August 1921)
2. Agustín Hombach, CM (3 February 1923 – 17 October 1933)
  - Msgr. Emilio Morales Roque (apostolic administrator 1934–1943)
  - Rev. Angelo María Navarro (1943–1947)
3. José de la Cruz Turcios y Barahona, SDB (8 December 1947 – 18 May 1962)
4. Héctor Enrique Santos Hernández, SBD (1962.05.18 – retired 1993.01.08)
5. Óscar Rodríguez Maradiaga, SDB (8 January 1993 – 26 January 2023); elevated to Cardinal in 2001
6. José Vicente Nácher Tatay, CM (26 January 2023 - )

=== Coadjutor bishops ===
- Luis de Cañizares, O.M. (1628-1629)
- Antonio del Carmen Monestel y Zamora (1915-1921), did not succeed to see; appointed Bishop of Alajuela, Costa Rica

=== Auxiliary bishops ===
- Evelio Domínguez Recinos (1957-1988)
- Robert Camilleri Azzopardi, OFM (26 July 2001 – 21 May 2004), appointed Bishop of Comayagua
- Juan José Pineda Fasquelle, CMF (21 May 2005 – 20 July 2018)
- Darwin Rudy Andino Ramírez, C.R.S. (2006-2011), appointed Bishop of Santa Rosa de Copán
- Teodoro Gómez Rivera (2021–2023), appointed bishop of Choluteca

== See also ==
- List of Catholic dioceses in Honduras
