= Gaspar de Andrada =

Gaspar de Andrada (born in Toledo) was a Spanish clergyman and bishop for the Roman Catholic Archdiocese of Tegucigalpa. He was ordained in 1588. He was appointed bishop in 1587. He died in 1612.
