= Pedro Reyes de los Ríos de Lamadrid =

Spanish Catholic bishop (1657–1714)

Most Reverend Pedro Reyes de los Ríos de Lamadrid
- Bishop of Yucatán
- Church: Catholic Church
- Diocese: Diocese of Yucatán
- In office: 1700–1714
- Predecessor: Antonio de Arriaga y Agüero
- Successor: Juan Leandro Gómez de Parada Valdez y Mendoza
- Previous post: Bishop of Comayagua (1699–1700)

Orders
- Consecration: 28 June 1699 by Giuseppe Archinto

Personal details
- Born: 2 August 1657 Seville, Spain
- Died: 6 January 1714 (age 56) Mérida, México

Pedro Reyes de los Ríos de Lamadrid, O.S.B. (2 August 1657 – 6 January 1714) was a Roman Catholic prelate who served as Bishop of Yucatán (1700–1714) and Bishop of Comayagua (1699–1700).

== Biography ==
Pedro Reyes de los Ríos de Lamadrid was born in Seville, Spain on 2 August 1657 and ordained a priest in the Order of Saint Benedict. On 11 April 1699, he was appointed during the papacy of Pope Innocent XII as Bishop of Comayagua. On 28 June 1699, he was consecrated bishop by Giuseppe Archinto, Archbishop of Milan, with Bartolomé de Ocampo y Mata, Bishop of Plasencia, and Francisco Zapata Vera y Morales, Titular Bishop of Dara, serving as co-consecrators. On 30 March 1700, he was appointed during the papacy of Pope Innocent XII as Bishop of Yucatán and installed on 13 October 1700. He served as Bishop of Yucatán until his death on 6 January 1714.

== Episcopal succession ==
While bishop, Lamadrid was the principal consecrator of:

- Dionisio Resino y Ormachea, Auxiliary Bishop of Santiago de Cuba (1707)

and the principal co-consecrator of:

- Baltasar de Mendoza y Sandoval, Bishop of Segovia (1699).

== External links and additional sources ==
- Cheney, David M. "Archdiocese of Tegucigalpa". Catholic-Hierarchy.org. (for Chronology of Bishops) ^{[self-published]}
- Chow, Gabriel. "Diocese of Comayagua (Honduras)". GCatholic.org. (for Chronology of Bishops) ^{[self-published]}
- Cheney, David M. "Archdiocese of Yucatán". Catholic-Hierarchy.org. (for Chronology of Bishops) ^{[self-published]}
- Chow, Gabriel. "Metropolitan Archdiocese of Yucatán". GCatholic.org. (for Chronology of Bishops) ^{[self-published]}

Catholic Church titles
Preceded by Ildefonso Vargas y Abarca	Bishop of Comayagua; 1699–1700	Succeeded by Juan Pérez Carpintero
Preceded by Antonio de Arriaga y Agüero	Bishop of Yucatán; 1700–1714	Succeeded by Juan Leandro Gómez de Parada Valdez y Mendoza
