= Archdiocese of San Pedro Sula =

Roman Catholic archdiocese in Honduras

Archdiocese of San Pedro Sula Archidioecesis de Sancto Petro Sula
- Catedral de San Pedro Apóstol

Location
- Country: Honduras

Statistics
- Area: 3,923 km^{2} (1,515 sq mi)
- Population: Total; Catholics: (as of 2011); 1,570,291; 900,000 (57.3%)
- Parishes: 32

Information
- Denomination: Roman Catholic
- Rite: Roman Rite
- Established: 2 February 1916 (110 years ago)
- Cathedral: Cathedral of St. Peter the Apostle

Current leadership
- Pope: Leo XIV
- Bishop: Michael Lenihan
- Bishops emeritus: Rómulo Emiliani Sánchez, Angel Garachana Pérez

Map

The Archdiocese of San Pedro Sula (erected on 2 February 1916 as the Vicariate Apostolic of San Pedro Sula) is a Latin Church ecclesiastical territory or archdiocese of the Catholic Church in Honduras. It was a suffragan of the Archdiocese of Tegucigalpa until 2023, when it was made a metropolitan archdiocese. It was elevated on 6 July 1963. Its archbishop is Michael Lenihan.

== Ecclesiastical Province of San Pedro Sula ==
Its suffragan sees are:

- Roman Catholic Diocese of La Ceiba
- Roman Catholic Diocese of Gracias
- Roman Catholic Diocese of Santa Rosa de Copán
- Roman Catholic Diocese of Trujillo (Honduras)
- Roman Catholic Diocese of Yoro

== Leadership ==
Bishops of San Pedro Sula

- Juan Sastre y Riutort, C.M. (1924–1949)
- Antonio Capdevilla Ferrando, C.M. (1953–1962)
- José García Villas, C.M. (1963–1965)
- Jaime Brufau Maciá, C.M. (1966–1993)
- Angel Garachana Pérez, C.M.F. (1994–2023)

Archbishops of San Pedro Sula
- Michael Lenihan, O.F.M.

=== Auxiliary bishops ===
- Rómulo Emiliani Sánchez (2002-2017)

== Territorial losses ==
Year	Along with	To form
1987		Diocese of Trujillo
2011		Diocese of La Ceiba
