= Jerónimo de Corella =

Spanish clergyman and bishop

Jerónimo de Corella O.S.H. (born in Spain) was a Spanish clergyman and bishop for the Roman Catholic Archdiocese of Tegucigalpa. He was ordained in 1556. He was appointed bishop in 1563. He died in 1575.
