= Roman Catholic Diocese of Santa Rosa de Copán =

Roman Catholic diocese in Honduras

Diocese of Santa Rosa de Copán Dioecesis Sanctae Rosae de Copán
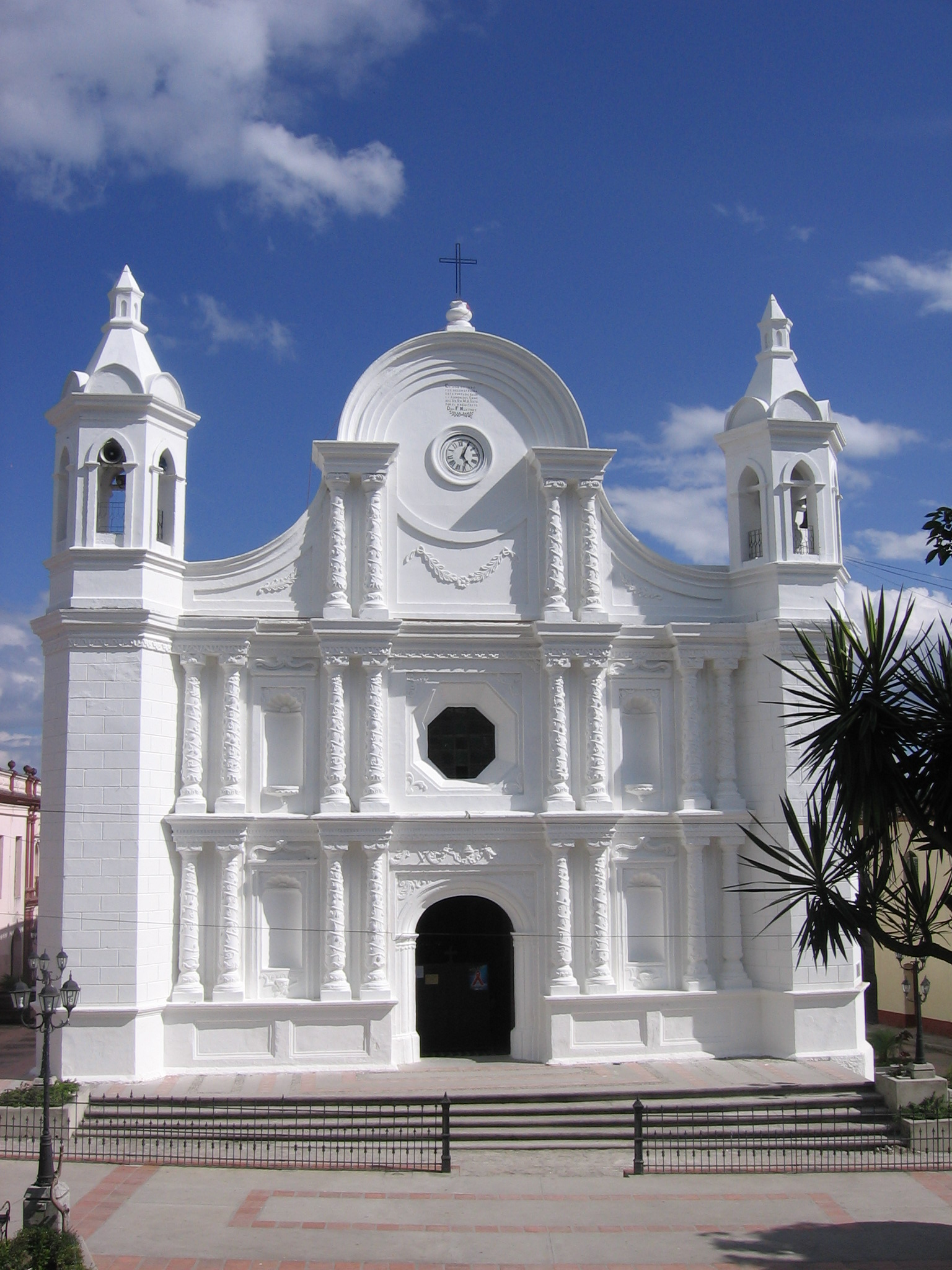
- Catedral de Santa Rosa

Location
- Country: Honduras
- Ecclesiastical province: Province of Tegucigalpa
- Metropolitan: Oscar Andrés Rodríguez Maradiaga, S.D.B.

Statistics
- Area: 17,360 km^{2} (6,700 sq mi)
- Population: Total; Catholics: (as of 2010); 1,289,000; 1,150,000 (90%)
- Parishes: 42

Information
- Denomination: Roman Catholic
- Rite: Roman Rite
- Established: 2 February 1916 (109 years ago)
- Cathedral: Cathedral of St. Rose

Current leadership
- Pope: Leo XIV
- Bishop: Héctor David García Osorio
- Bishops emeritus: Darwin Rudy Andino Ramírez, C.R.S.

Map

The Roman Catholic Diocese of Santa Rosa de Copán (erected 2 February 1916) is a suffragan of the Archdiocese of San Pedro Sula.

== Bishops ==
=== Ordinaries ===
- Claudio María Volio y Jímenez (1916–1926)
- Angelo Maria Navarro (1928–1951)
- Carlos Luis Geromini (1952–1958)
- Héctor Enrique Santos Hernández, S.D.B. (1958–1962), appointed Archbishop of Tegucigalpa
- José Carranza Chévez (1962–1980)
- Luis Alfonso Santos Villeda, S.D.B. (1984–2011)
- Darwin Rudy Andino Ramírez, C.R.S. (2011–2024)
- Héctor David García Osorio (since 2025)

=== Auxiliary bishop ===
- José de la Cruz Turcios y Barahona, S.D.B. (1943-1947), appointed Archbishop of Tegucigalpa

== External links and references ==
- "Diocese of Santa Rosa de Copán". Catholic-Hierarchy.
