= Juan Merlo de la Fuente =

Roman Catholic bishop

Juan Merlo de la Fuente (died 1665) was a Mexican clergyman and bishop for the Roman Catholic Diocese of Comayagua. He was in Nopalucan. He became ordained in 1651. He was appointed bishop in 1650. He died in 1665.
