= Óscar Rodríguez Maradiaga =

Catholic cardinal (born 1942)

His Eminence Óscar Andrés Rodríguez Maradiaga SDB
- Cardinal; Archbishop Emeritus of Tegucigalpa
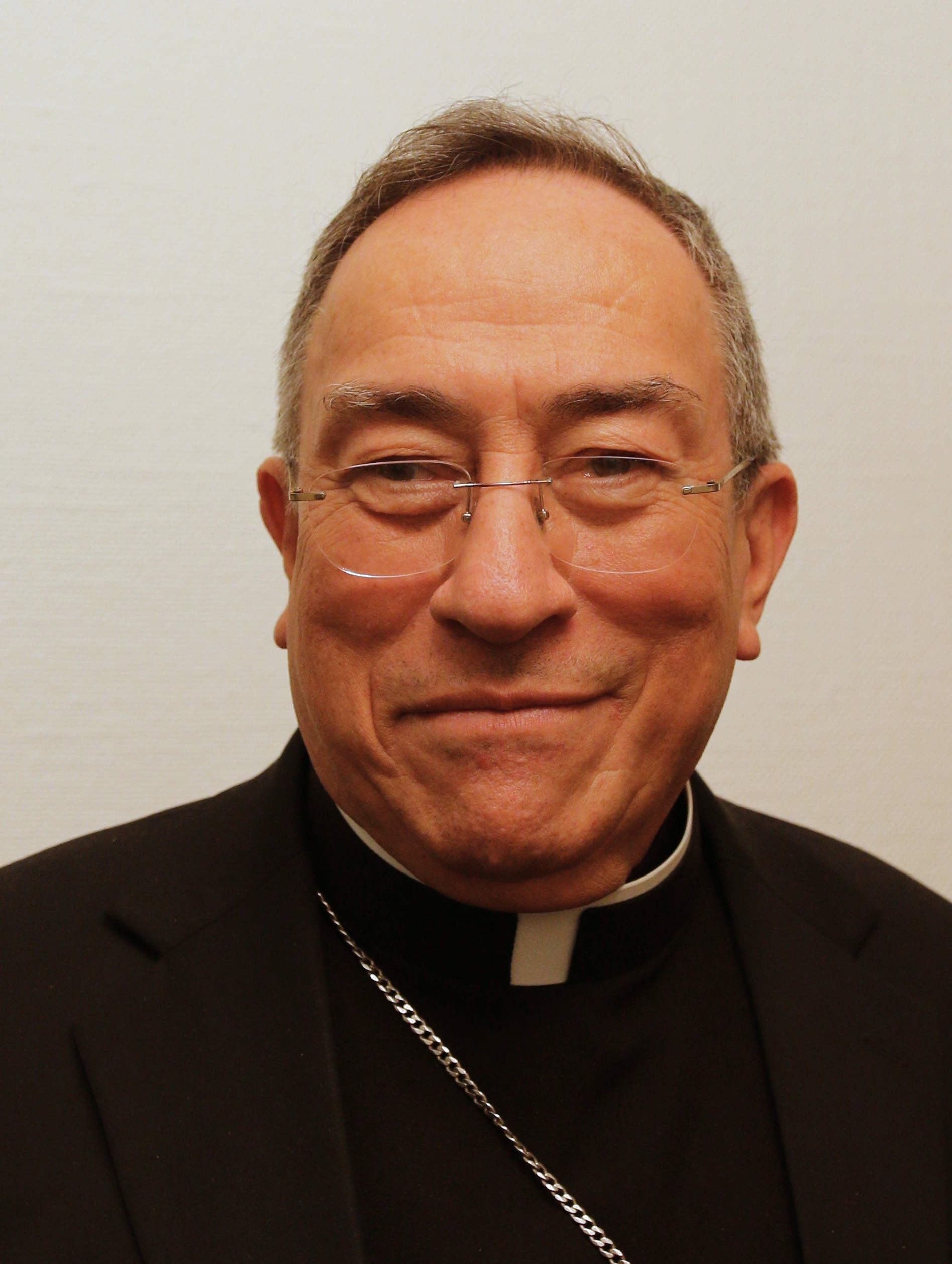
- Church: Catholic
- Archdiocese: Tegucigalpa
- Appointed: 8 January 1993
- Term ended: 26 January 2023
- Predecessor: Héctor Enrique Santos Hernández
- Successor: José Vicente Nácher Tatay
- Other post: Cardinal-Priest of Santa Maria della Speranza
- Previous posts: Auxiliary Bishop of Tegucigalpa (1978–1993); Titular Bishop of Pudentiana (1978–1993); Apostolic Administrator of Santa Rosa de Copán (1981–1984); General Secretary, Latin American Episcopal Conference (CELAM) (1987–1991); Apostolic Administrator of San Pedro Sula (1993–1995); President, CELAM (1995–1999); President, Episcopal Conference of Honduras (1996–2016); President, Caritas Internationalis (2007–2015); Coordinator of the Council of Cardinals (2013–2022)

Orders
- Ordination: 28 June 1970 by Girolamo Prigione
- Consecration: 8 December 1978 by Gabriel Montalvo Higuera
- Created cardinal: 21 February 2001 by Pope John Paul II
- Rank: Cardinal-Priest

Personal details
- Born: Óscar Andrés Rodríguez Maradiaga; 29 December 1942 (age 83) Tegucigalpa, Honduras
- Motto: Mihi Vivere Christus Est; (For to Me to Live is Christ)
- Coat of arms

Styles of Óscar Andrés Rodríguez Maradiaga
- Reference style: His Eminence
- Spoken style: Your Eminence
- Informal style: Cardinal
- See: Tegucigalpa

Óscar Andrés Rodríguez Maradiaga, S.D.B. (born 29 December 1942) is a Honduran prelate of the Catholic Church who was Archbishop of Tegucigalpa from 1993 to 2023. He was president of Caritas Internationalis and served as president of the Latin American Episcopal Conference (CELAM) from 1995 to 1999.

Rodríguez was elevated to the rank of cardinal in 2001. He has been the Vatican's spokesman with the International Monetary Fund and the World Bank, on the issue of Third World debt. He is a member of the Salesians.

== Early life ==
He was born in Tegucigalpa in Honduras, the third of the four children of Andrés Rodríguez Palacios and Raquel Maradiaga. As a boy, he dreamed of playing the saxophone in a dance band or becoming a pilot. Instead, he received an internal call for the religious life and joined the Salesians on 3 May 1961.

He earned doctorates in philosophy from the Institute "Don Rua" in El Salvador, in theology from the Salesian Pontifical University in Rome and moral theology from the Pontifical Lateran University. From the Austrian University of Innsbruck Rodríguez received a diploma in clinical psychology and psychotherapy.

== Ordination ==
He was ordained a priest on 28 July 1970, by Archbishop Girolamo Prigione in Guatemala City. Rodríguez was named the bishop's assistant in Tegucigalpa in the same year. He was dean of the Theology Department for three years at Guatemala's Francisco Marroquín University from 1975.

He then taught chemistry, physics, and music at Salesian colleges in El Salvador, Honduras, and Guatemala over the next fifteen years. During this time he also became a professor of moral theology and ecclesiology at the Salesian Theological Institute in Guatemala. He was also trained in classical piano and did studies in music in El Salvador, Guatemala, and the United States.

He speaks English, French, Italian, German, and Portuguese in addition to his native Spanish.

== Bishop and cardinal ==
On 28 October 1978, Rodríguez was named auxiliary bishop of Tegucigalpa and titular bishop of Pudentiana. He received his episcopal consecration on the following 8 December from Archbishop Gabriel Montalvo, with archbishops Héctor Enrique Santos Hernández and Miguel Obando y Bravo serving as co-consecrators.

Rodríguez was named Archbishop of Tegucigalpa on 8 January 1993.

Rodríguez was created Cardinal-Priest of Santa Maria della Speranza by Pope John Paul II in the consistory of 21 February 2001. He is the first cardinal from Honduras.

He was president of the Episcopal Conference of Honduras from 1996 to 2016. Rodríguez was one of the cardinal electors who participated in the 2005 papal conclave that selected Pope Benedict XVI.

On 5 June 2007 Rodríguez was elected president of Caritas International by the Caritas Confederation members at their 18th General Assembly in Vatican City. He was reelected to a second four-year term on 24 May 2011 and served until 2015.

On 12 June 2012, Rodriguez was appointed a member of the Congregation for Catholic Education for a five-year renewable term.

He was one of the cardinal electors who participated in the 2013 papal conclave that elected Pope Francis.

On 13 April 2013, he was appointed to the Council of Cardinal Advisers, a group of cardinals established by Pope Francis to advise him and to study a plan for revising Pastor Bonus, the Apostolic Constitution on the Roman Curia.

In 2013 an interview with Salt and Light, he said, "It is not just taking the constitution Pastor Bonus and trying to change this and that," referring to the 1988 papal constitution governing the organization of the Roman Curia. "No, that constitution is over," he said. "Now it is something different. We need to write something different."

Reflecting on the reorganisation of the Roman Curia, his advisory role to the pope and Catholic response to climate change. The cardinal made the comment in a 23 September interview with Catholic News Service in New York, where he was participating in interreligious meetings in his capacity as president of Caritas Internationalis. Reformation of the Roman Curia, the church's central administrative offices, is a normal response to changing times, has a significant 20th-century precedent, and was a focus of the pre-conclave meetings before Pope Francis was elected, Cardinal Rodriguez said. “Many people do not look back at history and they think now it's a revolution. No! This is a normal process… that takes place in order to answer to the new signs of the times,” he said.

On 10 March 2015, Rodriguez received the University of Dayton's Archbishop Oscar Romero Human Rights Award for his humanitarian work. Romero, who was beatified as a martyr on 23 May 2015 and is honored in a few other Christian denominations, was Archbishop of the Roman Catholic Archdiocese of San Salvador in San Salvador, El Salvador, when he was assassinated on 24 March 1980, in a hospital chapel while saying Mass, by a death squad assassin.

On 15 October 2020, Pope Francis renewed Rodríguez' appointment as Coordinator of the Council of Cardinal Advisers.

Rodríguez was diagnosed with COVID-19 on 4 February 2021.

On 26 January 2023, Pope Francis accepted Rodriguez' resignation as Archbishop of Tegucigalpa.

== Views ==
Rodríguez was the Holy See's spokesman with the International Monetary Fund and the World Bank on the issue of Third World debt, and he has encouraged countries to give development aid.

In 2009, Rodríguez agreed with the pope that distributing condoms was no solution to the HIV/AIDS crisis.

In a May 2002 interview, Rodríguez said "It gave me considerable food for thought that, at a time of total media focus on developments in the Middle East with all the injustices being perpetrated against the Palestinian people, U.S. television and press people were obsessed with sex scandals of 30 or 40 years ago." The Anti-Defamation League expressed "outage" at his remarks and then reported that after being told he had been "offensive", Rodríguez "apologized, said he never meant his remarks to be taken that way, and indicated that he would never say it again".

Rodríguez believes the Church must be "open" and in "constant dialogue", following the Second Vatican Council's example in rejecting attitudes of "arrogance and superiority".

Rodríguez gave the keynote address at the 2014 conference title "The Catholic Case Against Libertarianism"

== Accusations ==
=== Political interference ===
In 2007, Rodríguez was appointed to head the new "Commission of Notables" on the study of the energy crisis as it impacted Honduras. When challenged in an international interview about being unqualified for such a task, he responded quietly that he was educated in chemical engineering in Texas and knew a thing or two about petroleum. His choice as leader, however, was not his technical knowledge but the national respect for his integrity and his neutrality towards political groups in the country.

In 2008, Rodríguez criticized President Manuel Zelaya for using public money to promote his plans instead of spending it on the poor. He stated: "We were good friends. But he changed drastically... It was Chávez."

The Church, according to a spokesman, did not favor either the deposed Zelaya's alleged re-election plans or the coup against him. In a televised speech, Rodríguez warned that the return of Zelaya could lead to a bloodbath. He also called on the new government to promote national reconciliation and let aside revenge, pursuit, violence, and corruption. He further urged the Organization of American States to investigate all illegal deeds that happened during the rule of Zelaya.

Rodríguez was later accused by Zelaya of conspiring and collaborating with the coup leaders.

=== Financial mismanagement ===
The Italian magazine L'espresso reported that Pope Francis assigned retired Argentine Bishop Jorge Casaretto to undertake an investigation of Rodríguez' financial management in 2017 and that his report suggested that Rodríguez may have been involved in mismanaging Church funds, and may also have accepted hundreds of thousands of dollars from the Catholic University of Tegucigalpa. Other charges included mismanaged investments and practices that appeared irregular rather than illegal. Reports noted that Rodríguez was soon to reach retirement age, and the pope might consider that in evaluating the report.

=== Corruption ===
In a 2018 book, Martha Alegría Reichmann De Valladeres, widow of former Honduran ambassador to the Holy See Alejandro Valladares Lanza, accused Rodríguez of maintaining an abusive and mafia-like regime in Honduras for decades, promoting false investment schemes, diverting money from the local university and from the government to shadowy and immoral purposes. She also accused him of protecting his auxiliary bishop Juan José Pineda Fasquelle, who was forced to resign in 2018 following accusations of sexually abusing seminarians.

Catholic Church titles
Preceded by Victor Garaygordóbil Berrizbeitia	Titular Bishop of Pudentiana; 28 October 1978 – 8 January 1993	Succeeded by Peter William Ingham
Preceded by Darío Castrillón Hoyos	General Secretary of the Latin American Episcopal Council; 1987 – 1991	Succeeded by Raymundo Damasceno Assis
Preceded by Héctor Enrique Santos Hernández	Archbishop of Tegucigalpa; 8 January 1993 – 26 January 2023	Succeeded by José Vicente Nácher Tatay
Preceded by Nicolás de Jesús López Rodríguez	President of the Latin American Episcopal Council; 1995 – 1999	Succeeded by Jorge Enrique Jiménez Carvajal
Preceded by Raúl Corriveau	President of the Episcopal Conference of Honduras; 1996 – 13 June 2016	Succeeded by Ángel Garachana Pérez
Titular church established	Cardinal Priest of Santa Maria della Speranza; 21 February 2001 –	Incumbent
Preceded by Denis Viénot	President of Caritas Internationalis; 5 June 2007 – 15 May 2015	Succeeded by Luis Antonio Tagle
