= Catholic Church in Honduras =

The Catholic Church in Honduras is part of the worldwide Catholic Church, under the spiritual leadership of the Pope in Rome.

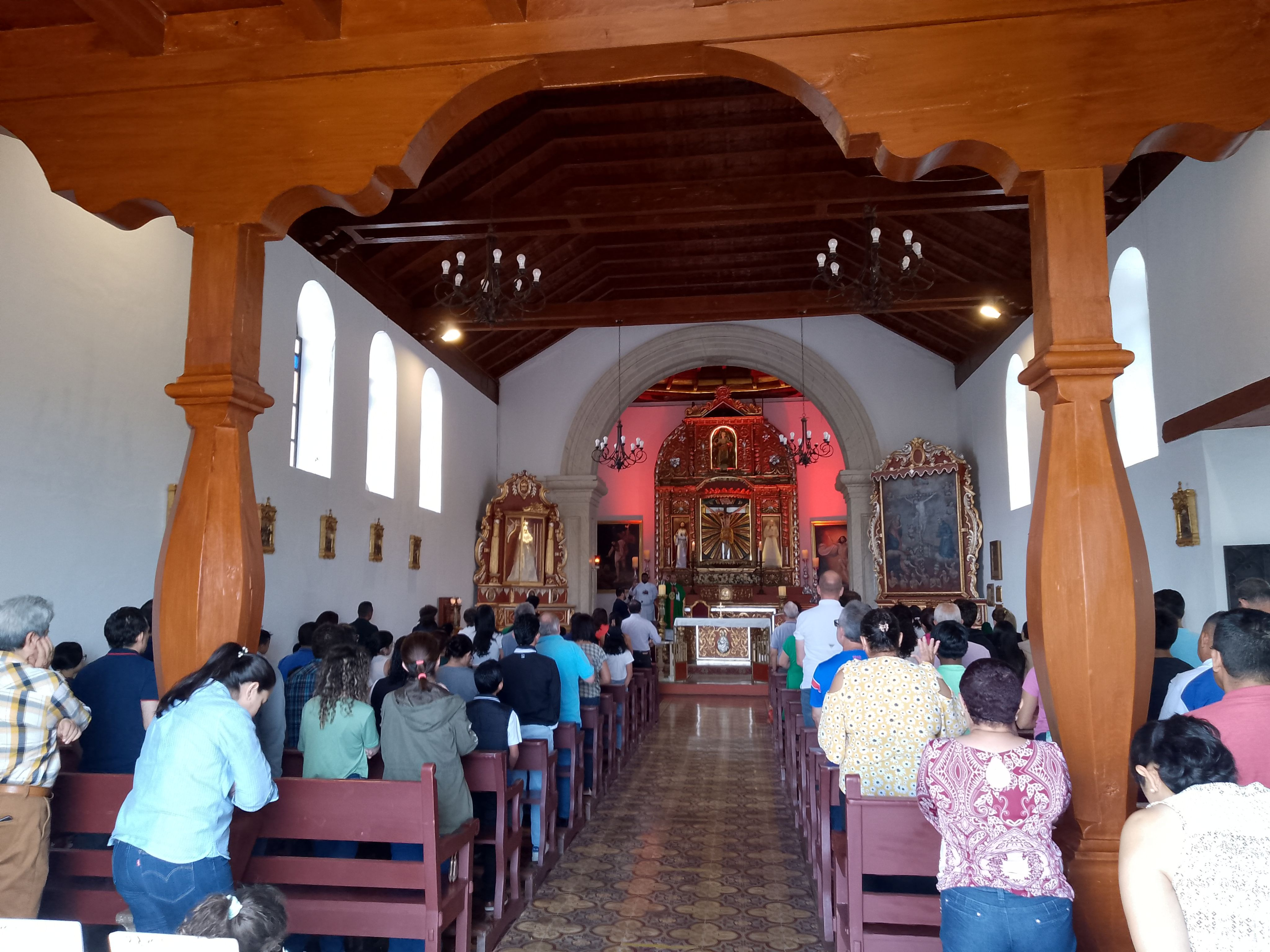
A Catholic mass in Santa Lucia.

There are over four million Catholics in Honduras - around three quarters of the total population. The country is divided into eight dioceses, including one archdiocese. According to the Latinobarómetro in 2018, 37% of the country is Catholic, 39% Protestant, 21% Unaffiliated and 3% Others.

== Territorial organization ==
- Map of the dioceses of the Catholic Church in Honduras
- The Catholic Church is present in the territory with 2 metropolitan headquarters and 10 suffragan dioceses.
- Archdiocese of Tegucigalpa
- Diocese of Choluteca
- Diocese of Comayagua
- Diocese of Danli
- Diocese of Juticalpa
- Archdiocese of San Pedro Sula
- Diocese of La Ceiba
- Diocese of Santa Rosa de Copan
- Diocese of Trujillo
- Diocese of Yoro
- Diocese of Gracias

== Pastoral challenges ==
In an interview with pontifical charity Aid to the Church in Need, the foundation's project coordinator for Central America spoke of the difficulties faced by the Catholic Church in Honduras, namely those posed by drug-fuelled gang violence.

"During our visit to the capital, our hosts explained that in some zones it is very difficult to carry out pastoral work, especially with all the conflicts between the maras [drug gangs], since the different gangs fight over territory. We visited a parish in a part of the city controlled by these gangs, which makes the Church’s work extremely complicated. The bishops’ conference has issued a call for peace and asked the government to take measures to quell the insecurity in the country. All this makes the Catholic Church’s pastoral work even more important than ever."

Other difficulties include a lack of priests. "In Honduras priests serve four times more people than, for example, in France. What is more, education levels are low, transportation outside of the cities is difficult, and there is hardly any formation in the parishes. The faithful are very poor and there is a great lack of catechetical material. They want formation material, but they don’t have the means to purchase it."

"On the other hand, the government makes it very difficult for foreign religious to obtain visas. They have to fulfil all sorts of requirements and present many documents, which makes it difficult to enter and to remain in the country", said Katz.

== See also ==
- Episcopal Conference of Honduras
- List of Catholic dioceses in Honduras
- List of Central American and Caribbean Saints
- Religion in Honduras
- Roman Catholic Archdiocese of Tegucigalpa
