= José Vicente Nácher Tatay =

The Most Reverend José Vicente Nácher Tatay C.M.
- Archbishop of Tegucigalpa
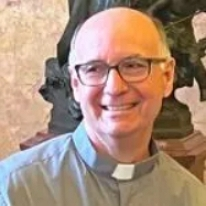
- Church: Roman Catholic Church
- Archdiocese: Tegucigalpa
- See: Tegucigalpa
- Appointed: 26 January 2023
- Installed: 25 March 2023
- Predecessor: Óscar Rodríguez Maradiaga

Orders
- Ordination: 26 October 1991 by Miguel Roca Cabanellas
- Consecration: 25 March 2023 by Óscar Rodríguez Maradiaga

Personal details
- Born: José Vicente Nácher Tatay; 10 April 1964 (age 62) Valencia, Spain
- Education: University of Alicante
- Motto: Humilis et simplex
- Coat of arms

José Vicente Nácher Tatay, C.M. (born 10 April 1964) is a Spanish-born prelate of the Catholic Church and a member of the Vincentians who has worked as a missionary in Honduras since 2000. He has been Archbishop of Tegucigalpa since March 2023.

== Biography ==
José Vicente Náchter was born on 10 April 1964 in Valencia, Spain. In his youth he and his family were parishioners of the Vincentian parish in Valencia's Monteolivete neighborhood, where his parents, brother and sister celebrated his appointment as archbishop in 2023. He also studied with the Salesians as a boy. He earned a licentiate in sociology at the University of Alicante. In 1985 he began his studies in philosophy and theology at the Vincentian major seminary in Barcelona and at the Faculty of Theology of Catalonia at the Ateneo Universitario Sant Pacià there from 1986 to 1991. He professed his vows as a Vincentian on 20 January 1990 and was ordained a priest on 26 October 1991 in the cathedral of Valencia by Archbishop Miguel Roca Cabanellas of Valencia.

From 1989 to 1997 he worked in Alicante with responsibility for youth ministry and popular missions; he spent three additional years in Valencia, ending the Spanish phase of his priesthood. He has worked as a missionary in Honduras for most of his career as a priest and member of the Province of St. Vincent de Paul-Spain, moving there in 2000. He was parish priest of Saint Vincent de Paul parish in San Pedro Sula from 2000 to 2005 and San José parish in Puerto Lempira from 2006 to 2016. He was episcopal vicar of the Mosquitia in the diocese of Trujillo. In that poor region lacking telephone and internet coverage, he created a solar power-based radio network to promote evangelization and training. Local people can also use the network to communicate with one another, overcoming the challenges of the difficult terrain and undeveloped infrastructure. He also established an educational program that provides meals and organizes sports activities. From 2016 to 2023 he was parish priest of Saint Vincent de Paul in San Pedro Sula once again and regional superior of the Vincentians in Honduras.

On 26 January 2023, Pope Francis named Nácher to succeed Cardinal Óscar Rodríguez Maradiaga as archbishop of Tegucigalpa. His appointment was unusual in that a priest is not often named an archbishop; it was compared to that of Carlos Castillo Mattasoglio in Lima, Peru.

He received his episcopal consecration on 25 March in the Basilica of Suyapa in Tegucigalpa from Maradiaga, his predecessor in Tegucigalpa.

== Writings ==
- "The Prophetic Character of the Vincentian Charism", translation of "Carisma Vicenciano: Memoria y Profecía" [XXVI Semana de Estudios Vicencianos], CEME, Salamanca, 2001
