= Diocese of Autlán =

Roman Catholic diocese in Mexico

Coordinates: 19.7727°N 104.3640°W

Diocese of Autlán Dioecesis Rivoriensis Diócesis de Autlán

Location
- Country: Mexico
- Ecclesiastical province: Guadalajara

Statistics
- Area: 5,212 sq mi (13,500 km^{2})
- Population: Total; Catholics: (as of 2006); 332.088; 320,386 (96.5%)
- Parishes: 47

Information
- Denomination: Roman Catholic
- Rite: Roman Rite
- Established: 28 January 1961 (65 years ago)
- Cathedral: Cathedral of the Holy Trinity

Current leadership
- Pope: Leo XIV
- Bishop: Eduardo Muñoz Ochoa
- Metropolitan Archbishop: Francisco Robles Ortega
- Bishops emeritus: Rafael Sandoval Sandoval

Map
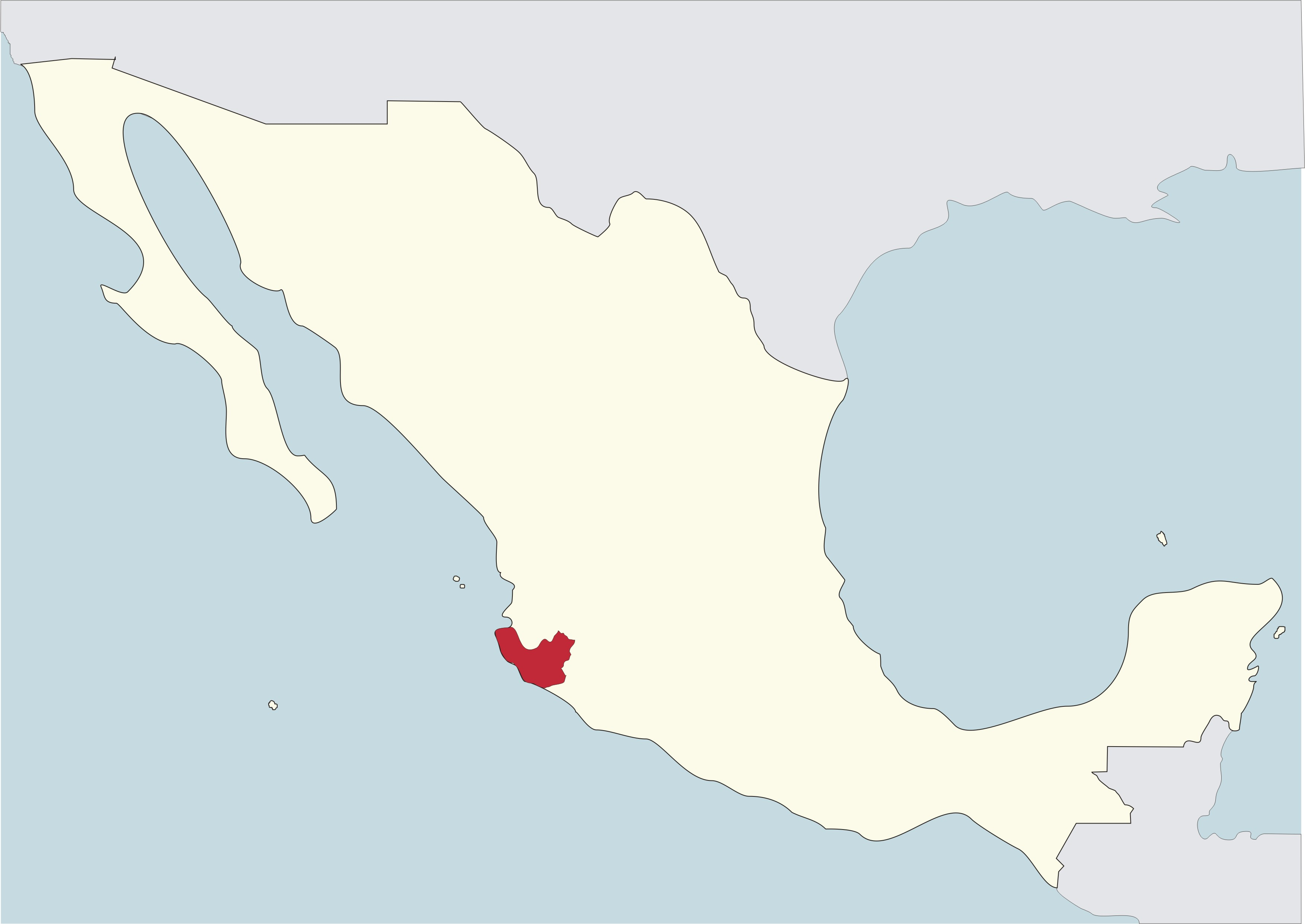

The Roman Catholic Diocese of Autlán (Latin: Dioecesis Rivoriensis) (erected 28 January 1961) is a suffragan diocese of the Archdiocese of Guadalajara.

== Bishops ==
=== Ordinaries ===
- Miguel González Ibarra (1961-1967)
- Everardo López Alcocer (1967-1968)
- José Maclovio Vásquez Silos (1969-1990)
- Lázaro Pérez Jiménez (1991-2003)
- Gonzalo Galván Castillo (2004-2015)
- Rafael Sandoval Sandoval (2015-2024)
- Eduardo Muñoz Ochoa (2024-)

=== Other priests of this diocese who became bishops ===
- Luis Robles Díaz, appointed nuncio and titular Archbishop in 1985
- José Francisco Robles Ortega, appointed Auxiliary Bishop of Toluca, México in 1991; future Cardinal
- Jonás Guerrero Corona, appointed Auxiliary Bishop of México, Federal District in 2001

== Episcopal See ==
- Autlán, Jalisco

== External links and references ==
- "Diocese of Autlán". Catholic-Hierarchy.

Specific
