= Renato Ascencio León =

Mexican Catholic bishop (1939–2022)

His Excellency Renato Ascencio León
- Bishop Emeritus of Ciudad Juárez
- Diocese: Ciudad Juárez
- Appointed: 7 October 1994
- Term ended: 20 December 2014
- Predecessor: Juan Sandoval Íñiguez
- Successor: José Guadalupe Torres Campos
- Previous post: Prelate of Madera (1988–1994)

Orders
- Ordination: 12 June 1965
- Consecration: 30 August 1988 by Girolamo Prigione

Personal details
- Born: 11 May 1939 León, Guanajuato, Mexico
- Died: 27 June 2022 (aged 83) León, Guanajuato, Mexico

Renato Ascencio León (11 May 1939 – 27 June 2022) was a Mexican Catholic prelate. He was territorial prelate of the Diocese of Madera from 1988 to 1994 and the Bishop of Ciudad Juárez from 1994 to 2014.

Catholic Church titles
| Preceded by Juan Sandoval Íñiguez | Bishop of Ciudad Juárez; 1994–2014 | Succeeded by José Guadalupe Torres Campos |
| Preceded by Justo Goizueta Gridilla | Prelate of Madera; 1988–1994 | Succeeded by Juan Guillermo López Soto |
