= Juan Sandoval =

Juan Sandoval may refer to:

- Juan Sandoval Íñiguez (born 1933), Roman Catholic cardinal
- Juan Sandoval (baseball) (born 1981), baseball pitcher with the Tampa Bay Rays
