= Juan Ruiz de Colmenero =

Spanish Roman Catholic prelate

Most Reverend Juan Ruiz de Colmenero
- Bishop of Guadalajara
- Church: Catholic Church
- Diocese: Diocese of Guadalajara
- In office: 1646–1663
- Predecessor: Juan Sánchez Duque de Estrada
- Successor: Francisco Verdín y Molina

Orders
- Consecration: December 1647 by Juan Bautista Acevedo Muñoz

Personal details
- Born: 1596 Budia, Spain
- Died: 28 September 1663 (age 67)

Juan Ruiz de Colmenero (1596 – 28 September 1663) was a Roman Catholic prelate who served as Bishop of Guadalajara (1646–1663).

== Biography ==
Juan Ruiz de Colmenero was born in Budia, Spain. On 25 June 1646, he was selected by the King of Spain and confirmed by Pope Alexander VII as Bishop of Guadalajara. In December 1647, he was consecrated bishop by Marcos Ramírez de Prado y Ovando, Bishop of Michoacán and installed to the bishopric on 24 December 1647. He served as Bishop of Guadalajara until his death on 28 September 1663.

== External links and additional sources ==
- Cheney, David M. "Archdiocese of Guadalajara". Catholic-Hierarchy.org. (for Chronology of Bishops)^{self-published}
- Chow, Gabriel. "Metropolitan Archdiocese of Guadalajara". GCatholic.org. (for Chronology of Bishops)^{self-published}

Catholic Church titles
Preceded by Juan Sánchez Duque de Estrada	Bishop of Guadalajara; 1646–1663	Succeeded by Francisco Verdín y Molina
