= Alonso Orozco Enriquez de Armendáriz Castellanos y Toledo =

Spanish Roman Catholic prelate

Most Reverend Alonso Orozco Enriquez de Armendáriz Castellanos y Toledo
- Bishop of Michoacán
- Church: Catholic Church
- Diocese: Bishop of Michoacán
- In office: 1624–1628
- Predecessor: Baltazar de Cobarrubias y Múñoz
- Successor: Francisco de Rivera y Pareja
- Previous posts: Auxiliary Bishop of Burgos (1605–1610); Bishop of Santiago de Cuba (1610–1624)

Orders
- Ordination: 17 April 1566
- Consecration: 11 September 1605 by Alfonso Manrique

Personal details
- Born: 1551 Seville, Spain
- Died: 5 December 1628 (aged 76–77) Irimbo, Michoacán, Mexico

Alonso Orozco Enriquez de Armendáriz Castellanos y Toledo, O. de M. (1551 – 5 December 1628) was a Roman Catholic prelate who served as Bishop of Michoacán (1624–1628), Bishop of Santiago de Cuba (1610–1624), and Auxiliary Bishop of Burgos (1605–1610).

== Biography ==
Alonso Orozco Enriquez de Armendáriz Castellanos y Toledo was born in Seville, Spain and ordained a priest in the Order of Our Lady of Mercy on 17 April 1566. On 27 June 1605, he was appointed by the King of Spain and confirmed by Pope Paul V as Auxiliary Bishop of Burgos and Titular Bishop of Sidon. On 11 September 1605, he was consecrated bishop by Alfonso Manrique, Archbishop of Burgos. On 30 August 1610, he was appointed by Pope Paul V as Bishop of Santiago de Cuba and installed on 9 September 1611. On 15 April 1624, he was appointed by Pope Paul V as Bishop of Michoacán where he served until his death on 5 December 1628. While bishop, he was the principal consecrator of Francisco de Manso Zuñiga y Sola, Bishop of Mexico.

== External links and additional sources ==
- Cheney, David M. "Archdiocese of Burgos". Catholic-Hierarchy.org. (for Chronology of Bishops) ^{[self-published]}
- Chow, Gabriel. "Metropolitan Archdiocese of Burgos (Spain)". GCatholic.org. (for Chronology of Bishops) ^{[self-published]}
- Cheney, David M. "Sidon (Titular See)". Catholic-Hierarchy.org. (for Chronology of Bishops) ^{[self-published]}
- Chow, Gabriel. "Titular Episcopal See of Sidon (Lebanon)". GCatholic.org. (for Chronology of Bishops) ^{[self-published]}
- Cheney, David M. "Archdiocese of Santiago de Cuba". Catholic-Hierarchy.org. (for Chronology of Bishops) ^{[self-published]}
- Chow, Gabriel. "Metropolitan Archdiocese of Santiago". GCatholic.org. (for Chronology of Bishops) ^{[self-published]}
- Cheney, David M. "Archdiocese of Morelia". Catholic-Hierarchy.org. (for Chronology of Bishops) ^{[self-published]}
- Chow, Gabriel. "Metropolitan Archdiocese of Morelia (Mexico)". GCatholic.org. (for Chronology of Bishops) ^{[self-published]}

Catholic Church titles
Preceded by.	Auxiliary Bishop of Burgos; 1605–1610	Succeeded by.
Preceded by Léonardo Abel	Titular Bishop of Sidon; 1605–1610	Succeeded by Juan Avellaneda Manrique
Preceded by Juan de las Cabezas Altamirano	Bishop of Santiago de Cuba; 1610–1624	Succeeded by Gregorio de Alarcón
Preceded by Baltazar de Cobarrubias y Múñoz	Bishop of Michoacán; 1624–1628	Succeeded by Francisco de Rivera y Pareja
