= Juan de Valle y Arredondo =

Spanish Roman Catholic prelate

Most Reverend Juan de Valle y Arredondo
- Bishop of Guadalajara
- Church: Catholic Church
- Diocese: Diocese of Guadalajara
- In office: 1607–1617
- Predecessor: Alfonso de la Mota y Escobar
- Successor: Francisco de Rivera y Pareja

Orders
- Consecration: December 1607 by Juan Bautista Acevedo Muñoz

Personal details
- Born: 1567 San Miguel del Arroyo, Spain
- Died: 20 February 1622 (age 55)

Juan de Valle y Arredondo (1567 – 20 February 1622) was a Roman Catholic prelate who served as Bishop of Guadalajara (1607–1617).

== Biography ==
Juan de Valle y Arredondo was born in San Miguel del Arroyo, Spain and ordained a priest in the Order of Saint Benedict. On 19 March 1607, he was selected by the King of Spain and confirmed by Pope Paul V as Bishop of Guadalajara. In December 1607, he was consecrated bishop by Juan Bautista Acevedo Muñoz, Patriarch of the West Indies with Juan Vigil de Quiñones y Labiada, Bishop of Valladolid, and Lucas Duran, Bishop Emeritus of Chiapas as co-consecrators. In 1617, he resigned as Bishop of Guadalajara; he died on 20 February 1622.

== External links and additional sources ==
- Cheney, David M. "Archdiocese of Guadalajara". Catholic-Hierarchy.org. (for Chronology of Bishops)^{self-published}
- Chow, Gabriel. "Metropolitan Archdiocese of Guadalajara". GCatholic.org. (for Chronology of Bishops)^{self-published}

Catholic Church titles
| Preceded by Alfonso de la Mota y Escobar | Bishop of Guadalajara; 1607–1617 | Succeeded by Francisco de Rivera y Pareja |
