= Diocese of Ciudad Juárez =

Diocese of the Catholic Church in Mexico

Coordinates: 31.7387°N 106.4869°W

Diocese of Ciudad Juárez Dioecesis Civitatis Iuarezensis Diócesis de Ciudad Juárez
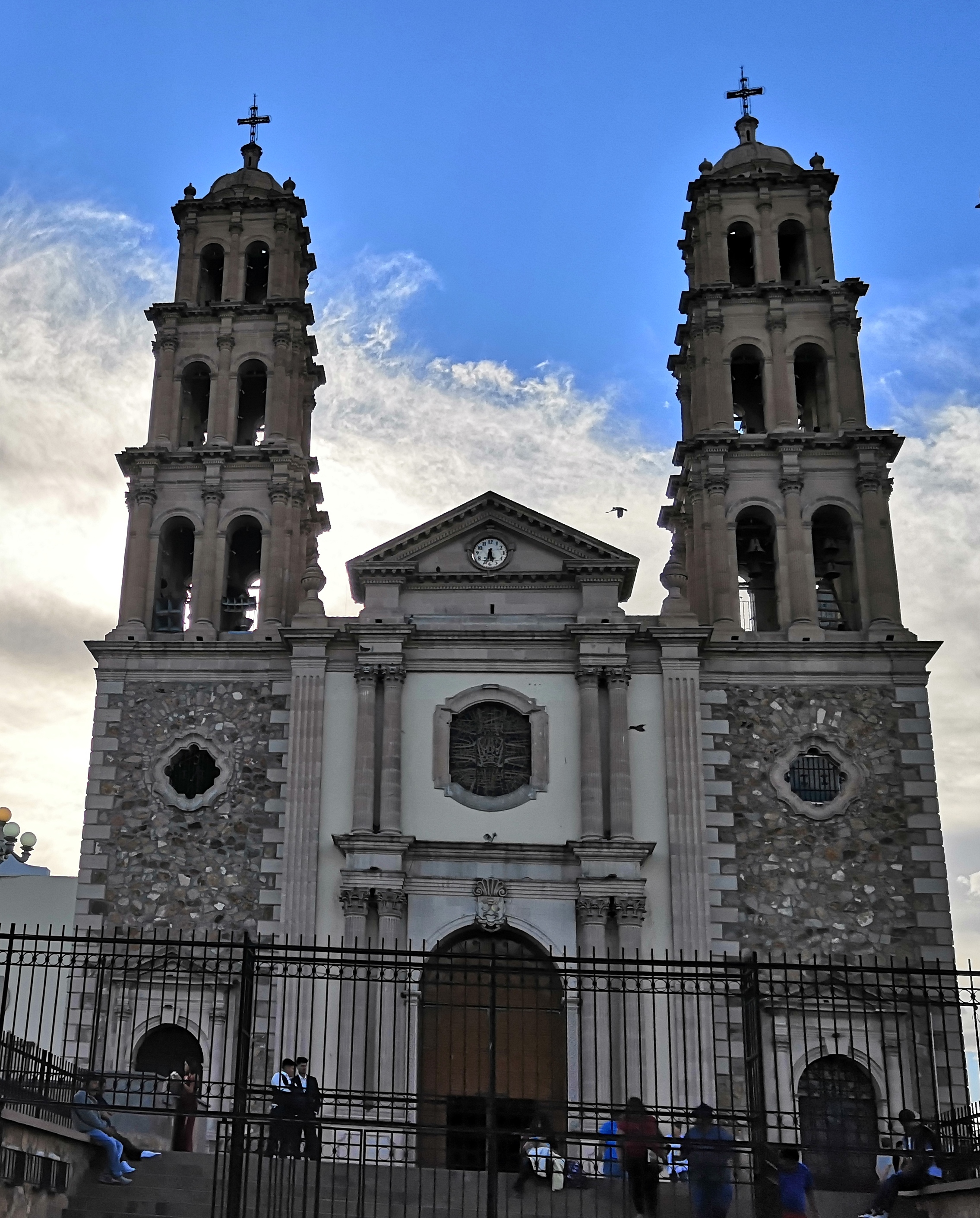
- Catedral de Nuestra Señora de Guadalupe

Location
- Country: Mexico
- Metropolitan: Archdiocese of Chihuahua
- Headquarters: Ciudad Juárez, Chihuahua, Mexico

Statistics
- Area: 29,639 km^{2} (11,444 sq mi)
- Population: Total; Catholics: (as of 2023); 1,701,500; 1,353,700 (79.6%)
- Parishes: 77

Information
- Denomination: Catholic Church
- Sui iuris church: Latin Church
- Rite: Roman Rite
- Established: 10 April 1957; 69 years ago
- Cathedral: Cathedral of Our Lady of Guadalupe
- Patron saint: Our Lady of Guadalupe
- Secular priests: 124 (104 Diocesan, 20 Religious Orders)

Current leadership
- Pope: Leo XIV
- Bishop: Sede vacante
- Metropolitan Archbishop: Constancio Miranda Weckmann

Map
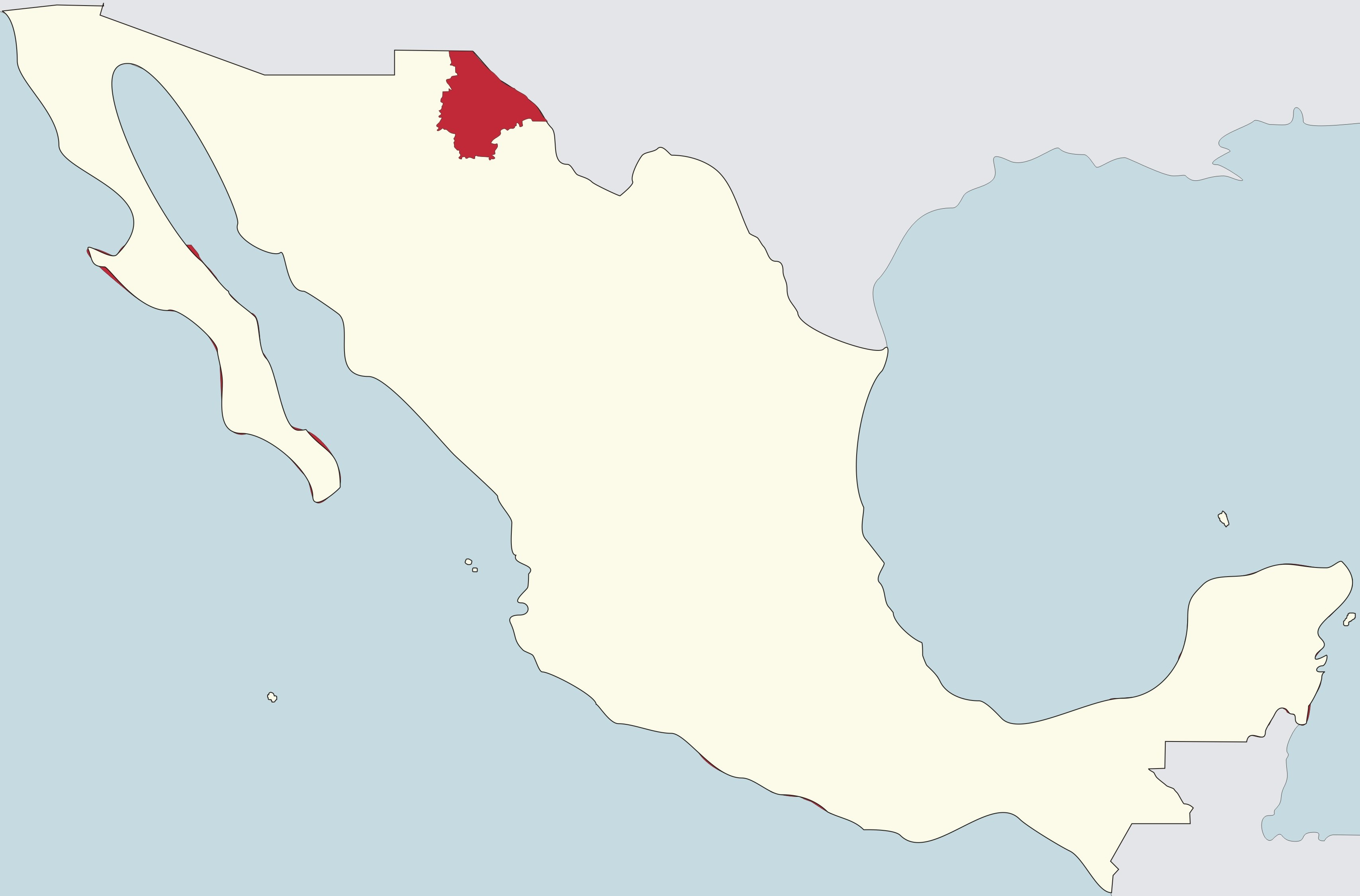

The Roman Catholic Diocese of Ciudad Juárez (Latin: Dioecesis Civitatis Iuarezensis) is located in the northern Mexican city of the same name, across the Río Grande from El Paso, Texas. It is part of the ecclesiastical province of Chihuahua and is a suffragan diocese of the Archdiocese of Chihuahua.

== History ==
The Diocese of Ciudad Juárez was erected by Pope Pius XII on 10 April 1957 from the Diocese of Chihuahua because of the population growth in the northern part of the state of Chihuahua. Pope Pius named Manuel Talamás Camandari as the first bishop, and by 1966 he was overseeing a diocese of 565,000 faithful. When Bishop Talamás retired in 1992, the diocese consisted of more than one million Catholics.

Juan Sandoval Íñiguez was selected by Pope John Paul II to succeed Talamás as second bishop on 11 July 1992, but remained for less than two years before being transferred to Guadalajara to replace the assassinated archbishop, Cardinal Juan Jesús Posadas Ocampo on 21 April 1994. His successor was Renato Ascencio León, who had been subsequently the bishop of the neighboring Diocese of Cuauhtémoc-Madera, Chihuahua. Bishop Ascencio was installed on 7 October 1994.

== Demographics ==
In 2023, the diocese had a Catholic population of 1,353,700. According to the Church census of 2023, the diocese was also made up of 124 priests, 77 parishes, 161 female and male religious, and covers 29,639 square kilometers.

== Leadership ==
=== Bishops of Ciudad Juárez ===
- Manuel Talamás Camandari (21 May 1957 – 11 July 1992), retired
- Juan Sandoval Íñiguez (11 July 1992 – 21 April 1994), appointed Archbishop of Guadalajara, Jalisco
- Renato Ascencio León (7 October 1994 – 20 December 2014), retired
- José Guadalupe Torres Campos (20 December 2014 – 13 May 2026), appointed Bishop of Ecatepec, México

=== Coadjutor bishop ===
- Juan Sandoval Íñiguez (1988-1992), succeeded

=== Auxiliary bishop ===
- José Guadalupe Torres Campos (2005-2008), appointed Bishop of Ciudad Juárez

=== Other priest of this diocese who became bishop ===
- Gerardo de Jesús Rojas López (1983-2004), appointed Bishop of Nuevo Casas Grandes, Chihuahua in 2004
