= Martín Sarmiento de Osacastro =

Roman Catholic bishop

Most Reverend Martín Sarmiento de Osacastro
- Bishop of Tlaxcala
- Church: Catholic Church
- Diocese: Diocese of Tlaxcala
- In office: 1548–1557
- Predecessor: Pablo Gil de Talavera
- Successor: Fernando de Villagómez

Orders
- Consecration: 7 April 1549 by Juan Lopez de Zárate

Personal details
- Died: 19 October 1557 Puebla de los Angeles, Mexico

Martín Sarmiento de Osacastro, O.F.M. (died 19 October 1557) was a Roman Catholic prelate who served as Bishop of Tlaxcala (1548–1557).

== Biography ==
Martín Sarmiento de Osacastro was appointed a priest in the Order of Friars Minor.

On 13 June 1548, he was appointed during the papacy of Pope Paul III as Bishop of Tlaxcala, and was accordingly consecrated on 7 April 1549 by Juan Lopez de Zárate, Bishop of Antequera.

He was the principal consecrator of Pedro Gómez Malaver, Bishop of Guadalajara (1550). In 1555, he attended the First Mexican Provincial Council.

Osacastro died on 19 October 1557.

== External links and additional sources ==
- Cheney, David M. "Archdiocese of Puebla de los Ángeles, Puebla". Catholic-Hierarchy.org. (for Chronology of Bishops) ^{[self-published]}
- Chow, Gabriel. "Metropolitan Archdiocese of Puebla de los Ángeles (Mexico)". GCatholic.org. (for Chronology of Bishops) ^{[self-published]}

Catholic Church titles
Preceded by Pablo Gil de Talavera	Bishop of Tlaxcala; 1548–1557	Succeeded by Fernando de Villagómez
