= Santa Maria della Presentazione =

Santa Maria della Presentazione may refer to:

- Santa Maria della Presentazione, Rome
- Santa Maria della Presentazione (Venice)

== See also ==
- Santa Maria (disambiguation)
