= José Trinidad González Rodríguez =

Mexican Catholic prelate (1943–2024)

- Auxiliary Bishop Emeritus of Guadalajara
- Appointed: 21 February 1997
- Term ended: 21 April 2015
- Other post: Titular Bishop of Menefessi (1997–2024)

Orders
- Ordination: 2 April 1972
- Consecration: 19 March 1997 by Juan Sandoval Íñiguez

Personal details
- Born: 12 September 1943 Jesús María, Nayarit, Mexico
- Died: 1 April 2024 (aged 80)
- Motto: In nomine Dei

José Trinidad González Rodríguez (12 September 1943 – 1 April 2024) was a Mexican Roman Catholic prelate.

== Biography ==
González Rodríguez received the sacrament of holy orders on 2 April 1972. He was a parochial vicar in Cuquío, Jalisco and a teacher and trainer in the diocesan seminary. He earned a licentiate in dogmatic theology from the Pontifical Gregorian University and a doctorate in theological anthropology from the Universidad Pontificia de México. As a parochial vicar in the Madre de Dios region, he was an advisor and ecclesiastical assistant to several lay movements, especially the Catholic Charismatic Renewal Movement.

On 21 February 1997, Pope John Paul II appointed him titular bishop of Menefessi and appointed him auxiliary bishop in Guadalajara. The Archbishop of Guadalajara, cardinal Juan Sandoval Íñiguez, ordained him bishop on 19 March of the same year. He was involved in the diocesan commission of lay organizations and was president of the Council for Economic Affairs and the Council for Beatification and Canonization. In the Mexican episcopate, he was a member of the Permanent Council, a delegate for the Ecclesiastical Province of Guadalajara, an advisor to the Catholic Charismatic Renewal Movement, a member of the Episcopal Commission before the Universidad Pontificia de México (UPM) and a UPM delegate to the Episcopal Commission for Vocations and Offices.

González Rodríguez served as the auxiliary bishop of the Roman Catholic Archdiocese of Guadalajara from 1997 to 2015 when pope Francis accepted his request to resign for health reasons.

González Rodríguez died on 1 April 2024, at the age of 80.

Catholic Church titles
| Preceded by — | Auxiliary Bishop of Guadalajara; 1997–2015 | Succeeded by — |
| Preceded by István Ács | Titular Bishop of Menefessi; 1997–2024 | Succeeded by Vacant |
