= Diocese of Aguascalientes =

Latin Catholic diocese in Mexico

Diocese of Aguascalientes Dioecesis de Aguas Calientes Diócesis de Aguascalientes
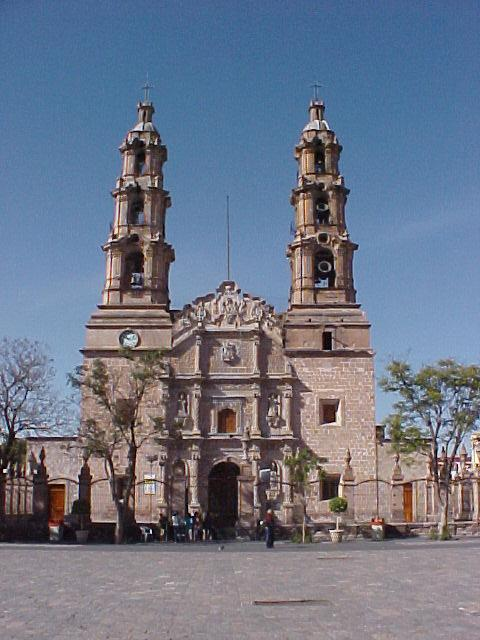
- Cathedral Basilica of Our Lady of the Assumption

Location
- Country: Mexico
- Ecclesiastical province: Province of Guadalajara
- Metropolitan: Guadalajara

Statistics
- Area: 4,326 sq mi (11,200 km^{2})
- Population: Total; Catholics: (as of 2006); 1,622,000; 1,599,000 (98.6%)
- Parishes: 99

Information
- Denomination: Catholic Church
- Sui iuris church: Latin Church
- Rite: Roman Rite
- Established: 27 August 1899 (126 years ago)
- Cathedral: Cathedral Basilica of Our Lady of the Assumption

Current leadership
- Pope: Leo XIV
- Bishop: Juan Espinoza Jiménez
- Metropolitan Archbishop: Francisco Robles Ortega

Map
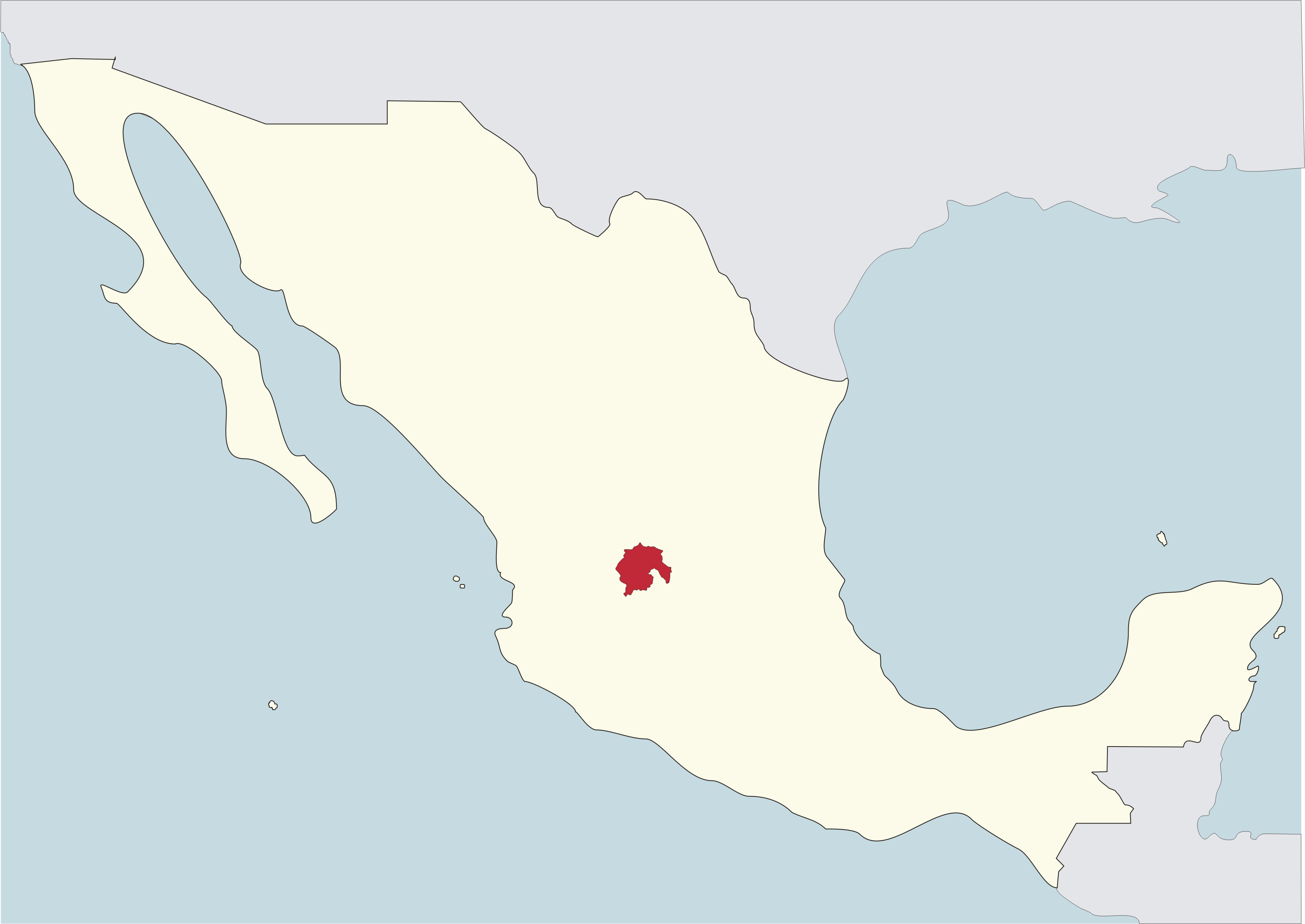

Website
- www.diocesisdeaguascalientes.org

The Diocese of Aguascalientes (Latin: Dioecesis de Aguas Calientes) is a Latin Church diocese of the Catholic Church in Mexico. Erected on 27 August 1899, it is a suffragan diocese of the Archdiocese of Guadalajara.

== Bishops ==
=== Ordinaries ===
- José María de Jesús Portugal y Serratos, O.F.M. (1902–1912)
- Ignacio Valdespino y Díaz (1913–1928)
- José de Jesús López y Gonzalez (1929–1950)
- Salvador Quezada Limón (1951–1984)
- Rafael Muñoz Nuñez (1984–1998) - Bishop Emeritus
- Ramón Godinez Flores (1998–2007)
- José María de la Torre Martín (2008–2020)
- Juan Espinoza Jiménez (2022–present)

=== Coadjutor bishop ===
- Alfredo Torres Romero (1975–1976); did not succeed to see; appointed Bishop of Toluca, México in 1980

=== Auxiliary bishops ===
- José de Jesús López y González (1927–1929), appointed Bishop here
- Ricardo Guízar Díaz (1977–1984), appointed Bishop of Atlacomulco, México

=== Other priests of this diocese who became bishops ===
- Juan María Navarrete y Guerrero, appointed Bishop of Sonora in 1919
- Emilio Carlos Berlie Belaunzarán, appointed Bishop of Tijuana, Baja California Norte in 1983

== Episcopal see ==
- Aguascalientes, Aguascalientes

== External links and references ==
- "Diocese of Aguascalientes". Catholic-Hierarchy.
