= Pedro de Ayala (bishop) =

Roman Catholic prelate

Most Reverend Pedro de Ayala
- Bishop of Guadalajara
- Church: Catholic Church
- Diocese: Diocese of Guadalajara
- In office: 1561–1569
- Predecessor: Antonius de Ciudad Rodrigo
- Successor: Francisco Gómez de Mendiola y Solórzano

Orders
- Consecration: November 8, 1562 by Alonso de Montúfar

Personal details
- Born: 1503 Guadalajara, Spain
- Died: September 19, 1569 (age 66) Guadalajara, Mexico

Pedro de Ayala (1503-September 19, 1569) was a Roman Catholic prelate who served as the third Bishop of Guadalajara (1561–1569).

== Biography ==
Pedro de Ayala was born in Guadalajara, Spain and ordained a priest in the Order of Friars Minor. On December 18, 1561, he was appointed by the King of Spain and confirmed by Pope Pius IV as the third Bishop of Guadalajara. On November 8, 1562, he was consecrated bishop by Alonso de Montúfar, Archbishop of Mexico with Vasco de Quiroga, Bishop of Michoacán, and Fernando de Villagómez, Bishop of Tlaxcala (Puebla de los Angeles) serving as Co-Consecrators. He served as Bishop of Guadalajara until his death on September 19, 1569.

== See also ==
- Catholic Church in Mexico

== External links and additional sources ==
- Cheney, David M. "Archdiocese of Guadalajara". Catholic-Hierarchy.org. (for Chronology of Bishops)^{self-published}
- Chow, Gabriel. "Metropolitan Archdiocese of Guadalajara". GCatholic.org. (for Chronology of Bishops)^{self-published}

Catholic Church titles
Preceded by Antonius de Ciudad Rodrigo	Bishop of Guadalajara; 1561–1569	Succeeded by Francisco Gómez de Mendiola y Solórzano
