= Juan Sánchez Duque de Estrada =

17th-century Spanish Catholic bishop

Most Reverend Juan Sánchez Duque de Estrada
- Bishop of Guadalajara
- Church: Catholic Church
- Archdiocese: Coahuila
- Diocese: Guadalajara, Mexico
- In office: 1636–1641
- Predecessor: Leonel de Cervantes y Caravajal
- Successor: Juan Ruiz de Colmenero

Personal details
- Born: 1581 Santa Cruz de la Jara, Spain
- Died: 12 November 1641 (age 60) Mexico
- Coat of arms

Juan Sánchez y Duque de Estrada (1581 – 12 November 1641) was a Roman Catholic prelate who served as Bishop of Guadalajara (1636–1641) in Mexico.

== Biography ==
Juan Sánchez y Duque de Estrada was born in Santa Cruz de la Jara, Spain. On 21 July 1636, he was nominated by King Philip IV and confirmed by Pope Urban VIII as Bishop of Guadalajara, Mexico. On 23 September 1637, he was installed in the bishopric, where he served until his death on 12 November 1641.

Catholic Church titles
Preceded by Leonel de Cervantes y Caravajal	Bishop of Guadalajara; 1636–1641	Succeeded by Juan Ruiz de Colmenero
