= Domingo de Alzola =

Roman Catholic prelate

Most Reverend Domingo de Alzola
- Bishop of Guadalajara
- Church: Catholic Church
- Diocese: Diocese of Guadalajara
- In office: 1582–1590
- Predecessor: Francisco Gómez de Mendiola y Solórzano
- Successor: Pedro Suarez de Escobar

Orders
- Consecration: October 19, 1582

Personal details
- Born: 1532 Mondragón, Spain
- Died: February 15, 1590 (age 58) Guadalajara, Mexico

Domingo de Alzola (1532 – February 15, 1590) was a Roman Catholic prelate who served as Bishop of Guadalajara (1582–1590).

== Biography ==
Domingo de Alzola was born in Mondragón, Spain and ordained a priest in the Order of Preachers. On October 1, 1582, he was appointed by the King of Spain and confirmed by Pope Gregory XIII as Bishop of Guadalajara. On October 19, 1582, he was consecrated bishop. In 1585, he attended the Third Mexican Provincial Council.

He served as Bishop of Guadalajara until his death on February 15, 1590.

== External links and additional sources ==
- Cheney, David M. "Archdiocese of Guadalajara". Catholic-Hierarchy.org. (for Chronology of Bishops)^{self-published}
- Chow, Gabriel. "Metropolitan Archdiocese of Guadalajara". GCatholic.org. (for Chronology of Bishops)^{self-published}

Catholic Church titles
Preceded by Francisco Gómez de Mendiola y Solórzano	Bishop of Guadalajara; 1582–1590	Succeeded by Pedro Suarez de Escobar
