= Diocese of Cuauhtémoc-Madera =

Roman Catholic diocese in Mexico

Diocese of Cuauhtémoc-Madera Dioecesis Cuauhtemocensis-Materiensis Diócesis de Cuauhtémoc-Madera
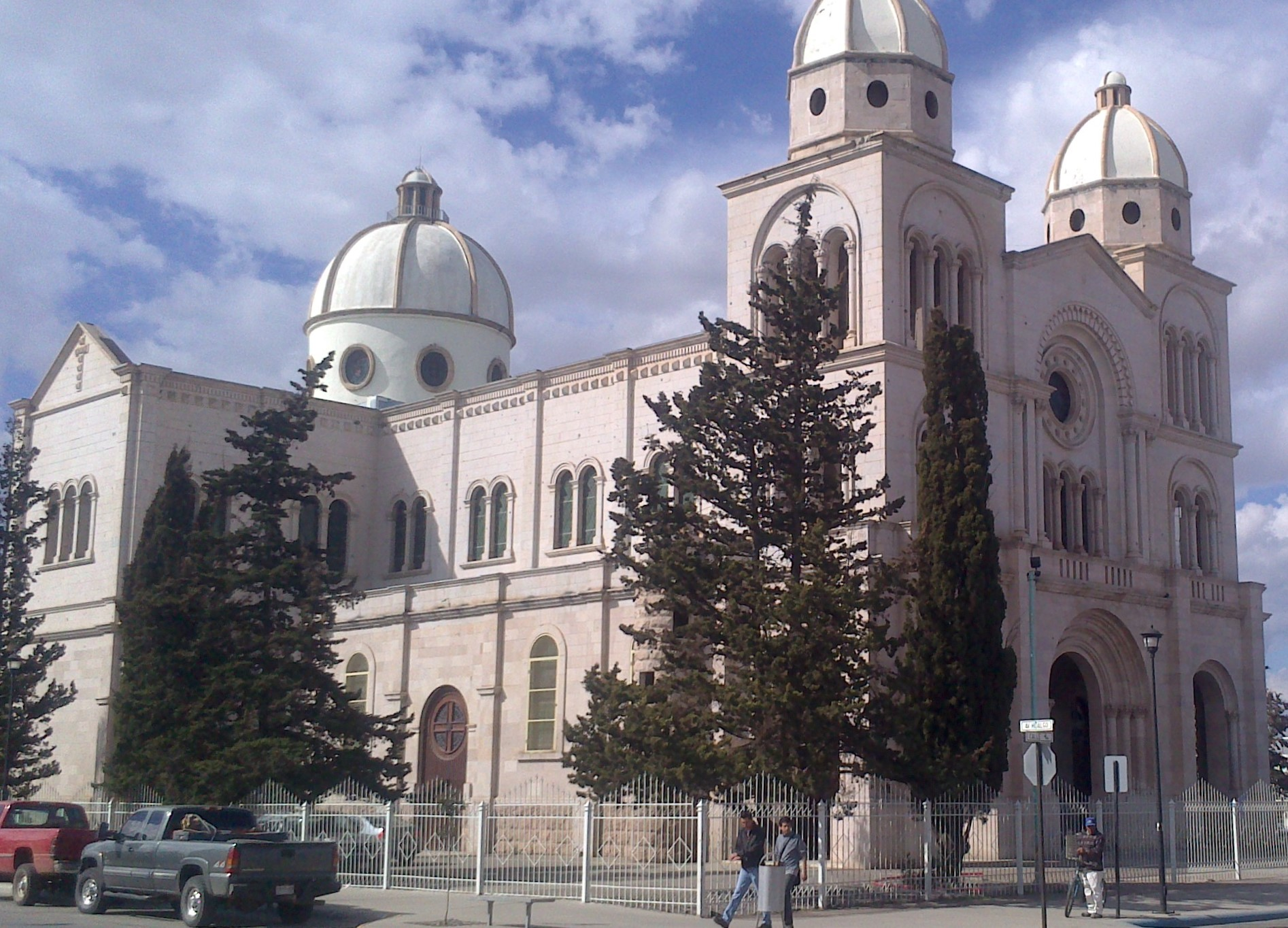

Location
- Country: Mexico
- Ecclesiastical province: Province of Chihuahua
- Metropolitan: Ciudad Cuauhtémoc, Chihuahua

Statistics
- Area: 14,447 sq mi (37,420 km^{2})
- Population: Total; Catholics: (as of 2006); 383,374; 332,804 (86.8%)
- Parishes: 26

Information
- Denomination: Roman Catholic
- Rite: Roman Rite
- Established: 25 April 1966 (60 years ago)
- Cathedral: Cathedral of St. Anthony

Current leadership
- Pope: Leo XIV
- Bishop: Jesús Omar Alemán Chávez
- Metropolitan Archbishop: Constancio Miranda Weckmann

Map
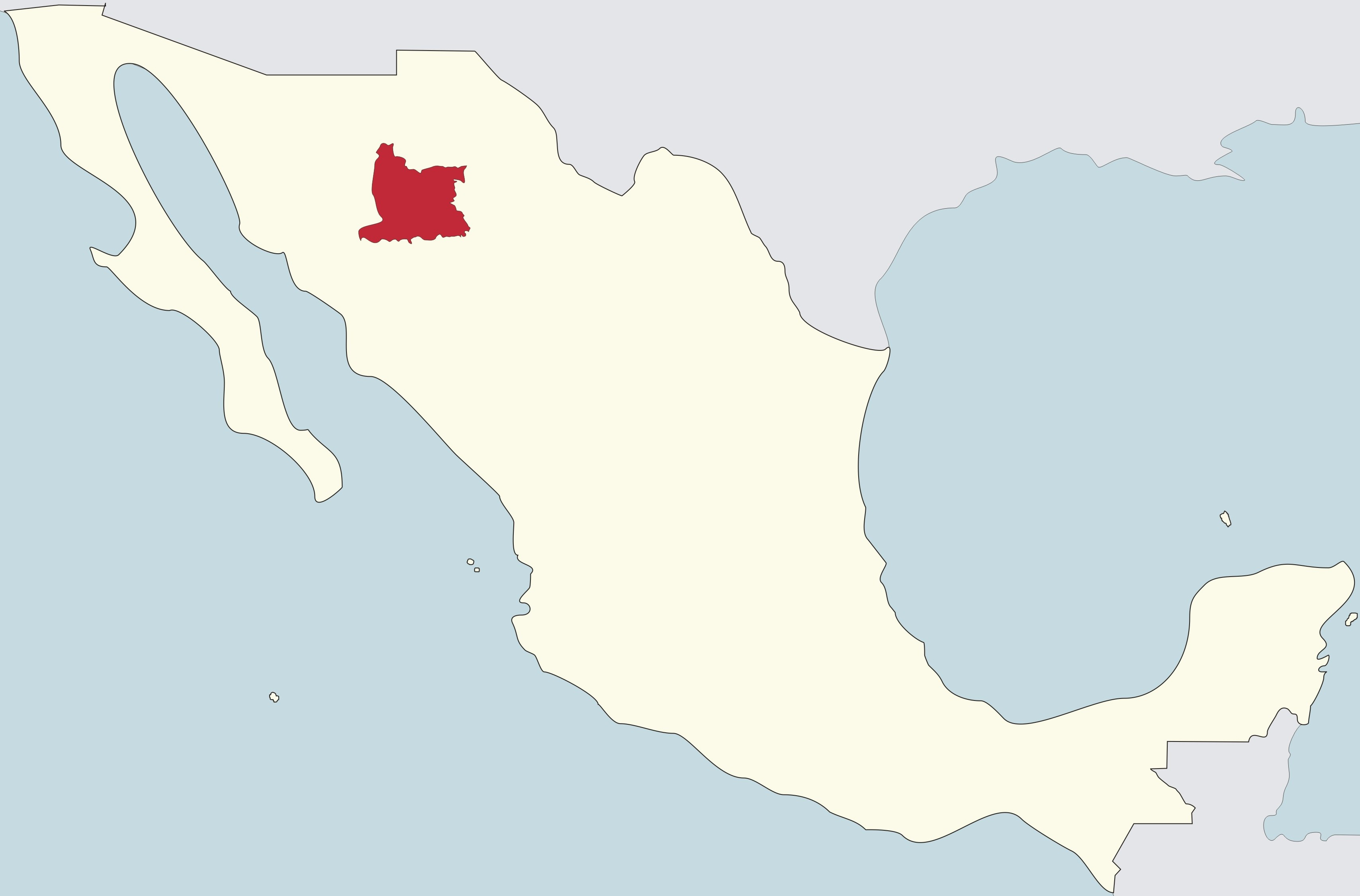

The Roman Catholic Diocese of Cuauhtémoc-Madera (Latin: Dioecesis Cuauhtemocensis–Materiensis) is a Latin suffragan diocese in the ecclesiastical province of the Metropolitan Archdiocese of Chihuahua (northern Mexico).

Its cathedral episcopal see is the Catedral de San Antonio, dedicated to Saint Anthony of Padua, in Cuauhtémoc, Chihuahua State.
It also has a Co-Cathedral, the former see of the territorial prelature of Madera : Cocatedral de San Pedro, dedicated to Saint Peter, in Madera, also in Chihuahua State.

== Statistics ==
As per 2014, it pastorally served 353,296 Catholics (86.8% of 406,980 total) on 37,405 km^{2} in 26 parishes with 42 priests (32 diocesan, 10 religious), 67 lay religious (10 brothers, 57 sisters) and 9 seminarians.

== History ==
It was erected as the Territorial Prelature of Madera on 25 April 1966, on territories split off from the Metropolitan Archdiocese of Chihuahua, Diocese of Ciudad Juárez and Diocese of Ciudad Obregón.

Its name was changed after its new see when it was elevated to bishopric as Diocese of Cuauhtémoc-Madera (a double name reflecting new and former see) on 17 November 1995, having gained more territory, again from the Archdiocese of Chihuahua, which became its Metropolitan.

== Bishops ==
=== Ordinaries ===
(all Roman Rite)

- Apostolic Administrator Father Justo Goizueta Gridilla, O.A.R. (1967 – 1970.01.14 see below)

Territorial Prelates of Madera

- Justo Goizueta Gridilla, O.A.R. (see above 1970.01.14 – 1988.02.02), retired
- Renato Ascencio León (1988.07.19 – 1994.10.07), appointed Bishop of Ciudad Juárez, Chihuahua

Suffragan Bishops of Cuauhtémoc–Madera

- Juan Guillermo López Soto (1995.11.17 – 2021.09.08)
- Jesús Omar Alemán Chávez (2022.12.07 – Present)

=== Other priest of this diocese who became bishop ===
- Constancio Miranda Wechmann, appointed Bishop of Atlacomulco, México in 1998

== See also ==
- Cuauhtémoc, Chihuahua
- Madera, Chihuahua

== Sources, external links and references ==
- "Diocese of Cuauhtémoc-Madera". Catholic-Hierarchy.
- GCatholic, with Google map and - satellite photo
