= Gonzalo Galván Castillo =

Mexican bishop (1951–2020)

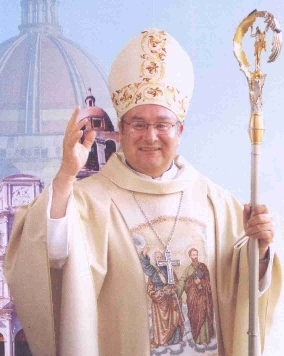
Gonzalo Galván Castillo

Gonzalo Galván Castillo (19 January 1951 – 22 November 2020) was a Mexican Roman Catholic bishop.

Galván Castillo was born in Mexico and was ordained to the priesthood in 1977. He served as bishop of the Roman Catholic Diocese of Autlán from 2004 until 2015.

Castillo died from COVID-19 in 2020.
