= Gregorio de Alarcón =

Most Reverend Gregorio de Alarcón
- Bishop of Santiago de Cuba
- Church: Catholic Church
- Diocese: Diocese of Santiago de Cuba
- In office: 1624
- Predecessor: Alonso Orozco Enriquez de Armendáriz Castellanos y Toledo
- Successor: Leonel de Cervantes y Caravajal

Orders
- Ordination: 22 December 1576
- Consecration: July 1624 by Juan Bravo Lagunas

Personal details
- Born: 1558 Castillo de Garcimuñoz, Spain
- Died: August 1624 (age 66) Santiago de Cuba, Spanish Empire

Gregorio de Alarcón, O.A.D. (1558 – August 1624) was a Roman Catholic prelate who served as Bishop of Santiago de Cuba (1624).

== Biography ==
Gregorio de Alarcón was born in Castillo de Garcimuñoz, Spain in 1558 and ordained a priest in the Ordo Augustiniensium Discalceatorum on 22 December 1576. On 29 April 1624, he was appointed during the papacy of Pope Urban VIII as Bishop of Santiago de Cuba. In July 1624, he was consecrated bishop by Juan Bravo Lagunas, Bishop of Ugento. He served as Bishop of Santiago de Cuba until his death in August 1624.

== External links and additional sources ==
- Cheney, David M. "Archdiocese of Santiago de Cuba". Catholic-Hierarchy.org. (for Chronology of Bishops) ^{[self-published]}
- Chow, Gabriel. "Metropolitan Archdiocese of Santiago". GCatholic.org. (for Chronology of Bishops) ^{[self-published]}

Catholic Church titles
Preceded by Alonso Orozco Enriquez de Armendáriz Castellanos y Toledo	Bishop of Santiago de Cuba; 1624	Succeeded by Leonel de Cervantes y Caravajal
