= José María de la Torre Martín =

Mexican bishop (1952–2020)

- Archdiocese: Roman Catholic Archdiocese of Guadalajara

Personal details
- Born: 9 September 1952; Mexico
- Died: 14 December 2020 (aged 68); Aguascalientes, Aguascalientes, Mexico

José María de la Torre Martín (9 September 1952 – 14 December 2020) was a Mexican Catholic bishop.

== Biography ==
De la Torre Martín was born in Mexico and was ordained to the priesthood in 1980. He served as titular bishop of Panatoria and as auxiliary bishop of the Roman Catholic Archdiocese of Guadalajara, Mexico from 2002 to 2008 and as bishop of the Roman Catholic Diocese of Aguascalientes, Mexico, from 2008 until his death in 2020.

He died in Aguascalientes City on 14 December 2020, after testing positive for COVID-19 during the COVID-19 pandemic in Mexico.
