= Juan Guillermo López Soto =

Mexican Roman Catholic prelate (1947–2021)

- Bishop of Cuauhtémoc-Madera
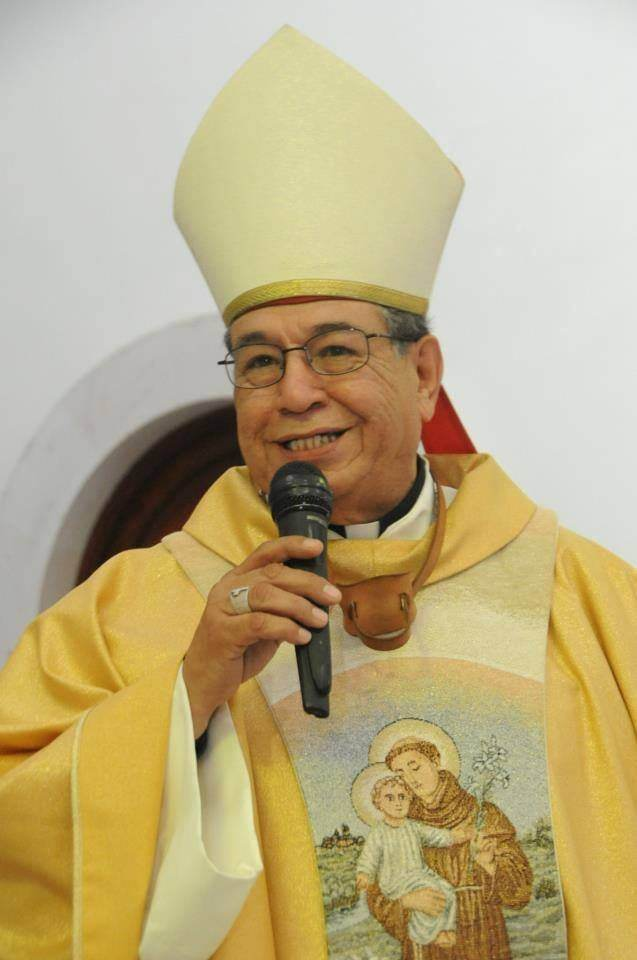
- López Soto in 2018
- Church: Catholic Church
- Diocese: Diocese of Cuauhtémoc-Madera
- In office: 17 November 1995 – 8 September 2021
- Predecessor: Renato Ascencio León
- Successor: Jesús Omar Alemán Chávez

Orders
- Ordination: 18 August 1972 by Adalberto Almeida y Merino
- Consecration: 15 December 1995 by Girolamo Prigione

Personal details
- Born: 10 February 1947 Santa Bárbara, Chihuahua, Mexico
- Died: 8 September 2021 (aged 74) Chihuahua City, Chihuahua, Mexico

Juan Guillermo López Soto (10 February 1947 – 8 September 2021) was a Mexican Roman Catholic prelate.

== Biography ==
He served as the Bishop of the Roman Catholic Diocese of Cuauhtémoc-Madera, based in Chihuahua state, for 26 years from November 1995, until his death in September 2021.

On 30 August 2021, the Diocese of Cuauhtémoc-Madera announced that López Soto had tested positive for COVID-19. He was admitted to Hospital Ángeles, a private hospital in the city of Chihuahua for treatment. López also suffered from several pre-existing cardiac conditions, including three heart surgeries in September 2018 for an obstructed artery, followed by a heart attack days after the operations.

Bishop Juan Guillermo López Soto died from complications of COVID-19, during the COVID-19 pandemic in Mexico, at the Hospital Ángeles in Chihuahua on 8 September 2021, at the age of 74. He had planned to retire in February 2022 when he reached the mandatory retirement age of 75.
