= Francisco Santos García de Ontiveros y Martínez =

Spanish Roman Catholic prelate (died 1596)

Most Reverend Francisco Santos García de Ontiveros y Martínez
- Bishop of Guadalajara
- Church: Catholic Church
- Diocese: Diocese of Guadalajara
- In office: 1592–1596
- Predecessor: Pedro Suarez de Escobar
- Successor: Alfonso de la Mota y Escobar

Orders
- Consecration: 3 October 1593 by Diego de Romano y Govea

Personal details
- Died: 28 June 1596 Almería, Spain

Francisco Santos García de Ontiveros y Martínez (died 28 June 1596) was a Roman Catholic prelate who served as Bishop of Guadalajara (1592–1596).

== Biography ==
On 22 May 1592, Francisco Santos García de Ontiveros y Martínez was selected by the King of Spain and confirmed by Pope Clement VIII as Bishop of Guadalajara. On 3 October 1593, he was consecrated bishop by Diego de Romano y Govea, Bishop of Tlaxcala, and on 6 November 1593, he was installed to the bishopric. He served as Bishop of Guadalajara until his death on 28 June 1596.

== External links and additional sources ==
- Cheney, David M. "Archdiocese of Guadalajara". Catholic-Hierarchy.org. (for Chronology of Bishops)^{self-published}
- Chow, Gabriel. "Metropolitan Archdiocese of Guadalajara". GCatholic.org. (for Chronology of Bishops)^{self-published}

Catholic Church titles
Preceded by Pedro Suarez de Escobar	Bishop of Guadalajara; 1592–1596	Succeeded by Alfonso de la Mota y Escobar
