= Felipe Galindo Chávez y Pineda =

Most Reverend Felipe Galindo Chávez y Pineda
- Bishop of Guadalajara
- Church: Catholic Church
- Diocese: Diocese of Guadalajara
- In office: 1695–1702
- Predecessor: Juan de Santiago y León Garabito
- Successor: Diego Camacho y Ávila
- Previous post: Bishop of Puerto Rico (1676–1677)

Orders
- Consecration: November 30, 1695 by Manuel Fernández de Santa Cruz y Sahagún

Personal details
- Born: 1632 Veracruz, Mexico
- Died: March 7, 1702 (age 52) Guadalajara, Mexico

Felipe Galindo Chávez y Pineda (July 13, 1641 – July 12, 1694) was a Roman Catholic prelate who served as Bishop of Guadalajara (1695–1702).

== Biography ==
Felipe Galindo Chávez y Pineda was born in Veracruz, Mexico, and ordained a priest in the Order of Preachers. On May 30, 1695, he was appointed by the King of Spain and confirmed by Pope Innocent XII as Bishop of Guadalajara.

On November 30, 1695, he was consecrated bishop by Manuel Fernández de Santa Cruz y Sahagún, Bishop of Tlaxcala. He served as Bishop of Guadalajara until his death on March 7, 1702.

== See also ==
- Catholic Church in Mexico

== External links and additional sources ==
- Cheney, David M. "Archdiocese of Guadalajara". Catholic-Hierarchy.org. (for Chronology of Bishops)^{self-published}
- Chow, Gabriel. "Metropolitan Archdiocese of Guadalajara". GCatholic.org. (for Chronology of Bishops)^{self-published}

Catholic Church titles
| Preceded by Juan de Santiago y León Garabito | Bishop of Guadalajara; 1695–1702 | Succeeded by Diego Camacho y Ávila |
