= Alfonso Manrique =

Spanish Roman Catholic prelate

Most Reverend Alfonso Manrique
- Archbishop of Burgos
- Church: Catholic Church
- Archdiocese: Archdiocese of Burgos
- In office: 1604–1612
- Predecessor: Antonio Zapata y Cisneros
- Successor: Fernando Acevedo González

Orders
- Consecration: 24 October 1604 by Pietro Aldobrandini

Personal details
- Born: 1560 Spain
- Died: 27 September 1612 (age 52) Burgos, Spain

Alfonso Manrique (1560 – 27 September 1612) was a Roman Catholic prelate who served as Archbishop of Burgos (1604–1612).

== Biography ==
Alfonso Manrique was born in Spain in 1560. On 20 October 1604, he was appointed during the papacy of Pope Clement VIII as Archbishop of Burgos. On 24 October 1604, he was consecrated bishop by Pietro Aldobrandini, Archbishop of Ravenna, with Fabio Biondi, Titular Patriarch of Jerusalem, and Tommaso Lapis, Bishop of Fano, serving as co-consecrators. He served as Archbishop of Burgos until his death on 27 September 1612. While bishop, he was the principal consecrator of Alonso Orozco Enriquez de Armendáriz Castellanos y Toledo, Auxiliary Bishop of Burgos and Titular Bishop of Sidon (1605).

== External links and additional sources ==
- Cheney, David M. "Archdiocese of Burgos". Catholic-Hierarchy.org. (for Chronology of Bishops) ^{[self-published]}
- Chow, Gabriel. "Metropolitan Archdiocese of Burgos (Spain)". GCatholic.org. (for Chronology of Bishops) ^{[self-published]}

Catholic Church titles
| Preceded by Antonio Zapata y Cisneros | Archbishop of Burgos; 1604–1612 | Succeeded by Fernando Acevedo González |
