= Diego Camacho y Ávila =

Latin Catholic prelate

Most Reverend Diego Camacho y Ávila
- Archbishop of Manila
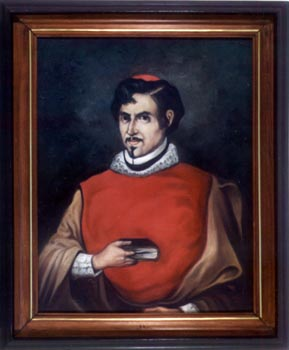
- Church: Catholic Church
- Diocese: Manila
- See: Manila
- In office: 1704–1712
- Predecessor: Felipe Galindo Chávez y Pineda
- Successor: Manuel de Mimbela y Morlans
- Previous post: Archbishop ad personam of Guadalajara

Orders
- Consecration: 19 August 1696 by Manuel Fernández de Santa Cruz y Sahagún

Personal details
- Born: 12 November 1652 Badajoz, Spain
- Died: 19 October 1712 (aged 59) Guadalajara, Jalisco, Mexico

Diego Camacho y Ávila (12 November 1652 – 19 October 1712) was a Latin Catholic prelate who served as Archbishop of Manila (1695–1704), and Archbishop ad personam of Guadalajara (1704–1712).

== Biography ==
Diego Camacho y Ávila was born in Badajoz, Spain on 12 November 1652. On 28 November 1695, he was appointed during the papacy of Pope Innocent XII as Archbishop of Manila. On 19 August 1696, he was consecrated bishop by Manuel Fernández de Santa Cruz y Sahagún, Bishop of Tlaxcala. On 14 January 1704, he was appointed during the papacy of Pope Clement XI as Archbishop ad personam of Guadalajara and installed on 24 May 1707. He served as Bishop of Guadalajara until his death on 19 October 1712. While bishop, he was the principal consecrator of Miguel Bayot, Bishop of Cebú (1699).

== External links and additional sources ==
- Cheney, David M. "Archdiocese of Manila". Catholic-Hierarchy.org. (for Chronology of Bishops) ^{[self-published]}
- Chow, Gabriel. "Metropolitan Archdiocese of Manila". GCatholic.org. (for Chronology of Bishops) ^{[self-published]}
- Cheney, David M. "Archdiocese of Guadalajara". Catholic-Hierarchy.org. (for Chronology of Bishops) ^{[self-published]}
- Chow, Gabriel. "Metropolitan Archdiocese of Guadalajara". GCatholic.org. (for Chronology of Bishops) ^{[self-published]}

Catholic Church titles
Preceded by Felipe Fernandez de Pardo	Archbishop of Manila; 1704–1712	Succeeded by Francisco de la Cuesta
Preceded by Felipe Galindo Chávez y Pineda	Archbishop (Personal Title) of Guadalajara; 1695–1704	Succeeded by Manuel de Mimbela y Morlans
