= Pedro Gómez Malaver =

Spanish Roman Catholic prelate

Most Reverend Pedro Gómez Malaver
- Bishop of Guadalajara
- Church: Catholic Church
- Diocese: Diocese of Guadalajara
- In office: 1548–1551
- Predecessor: None
- Successor: Antonius de Ciudad Rodrigo

Orders
- Consecration: 7 March 1550 by Martín Sarmiento de Osacastro

Personal details
- Died: 28 December 1551 Guadalajara, Mexico

Pedro Gómez Malaver (also Pedro Gómez Maraver) (died 28 December 1551) was a Roman Catholic prelate who served as the first Bishop of Guadalajara (1548–1551).

== Biography ==
On 13 July 1548 Pedro Gómez Malaver was appointed by the King of Spain and confirmed by Pope Paul III as the first Bishop of Guadalajara. On 7 March 1550 he was consecrated bishop by Martín Sarmiento de Osacastro, Bishop of Tlaxcala. He served as Bishop of Guadalajara until his death on 28 December 1551.

== External links and additional sources ==
- Cheney, David M. "Archdiocese of Guadalajara". Catholic-Hierarchy.org. (for Chronology of Bishops)^{self-published}
- Chow, Gabriel. "Metropolitan Archdiocese of Guadalajara". GCatholic.org. (for Chronology of Bishops)^{self-published}

Religious titles
Preceded by None	Bishop of Guadalajara; 1548–1551	Succeeded by Antonius de Ciudad Rodrigo
