= Rafael Francisco Martínez Sáinz =

Mexican Roman Catholic bishop

Rafael Francisco Martínez Sáinz (September 29, 1935 – November 6, 2016) was a Roman Catholic bishop.

Ordained to the priesthood in 1959, Martinez Sáinz served as auxiliary bishop of the Roman Catholic Archdiocese of Guadalajara, Mexico, from 2002 to 2012.
