= Alfonso de la Mota y Escobar =

Roman Catholic prelate

Most Reverend Alfonso de la Mota y Escobar
- Bishop of Tlaxcala (Puebla de los Angeles)
- Church: Catholic Church
- Diocese: Diocese of Tlaxcala (Puebla de los Angeles)
- In office: 1607–1625
- Predecessor: Diego de Romano y Govea
- Successor: Gutiérrez Bernardo de Quirós
- Previous post: Bishop of Santiago de Cuba (1580–1597)

Orders
- Consecration: June 1599

Personal details
- Born: 18 May 1546 Mexico
- Died: 16 March 1625 (aged 78) Tlaxcala, Mexico

Alfonso de la Mota y Escobar (18 May 1546 – 16 March 1625) was a Roman Catholic prelate who served as Bishop of Tlaxcala (Puebla de los Angeles) (1607–1625), Bishop of Guadalajara (1598–1607), and Bishop Elect of Nicaragua (1594–1595).

== Biography ==
Alfonso de la Mota y Escobar was born in Mexico on 18 May 1546. On 31 March 1594, he was appointed during the papacy of Pope Clement VIII as Bishop of Nicaragua but resigned in 1595. On 11 March 1598, he was appointed during the papacy of Pope Clement VIII as Bishop of Guadalajara. In June 1599, he was consecrated bishop On 11 March 1598, he was appointed during the papacy of Pope Clement VIII as Bishop of Tlaxcala (Puebla de los Angeles). He served as Bishop of Tlaxcala (Puebla de los Angeles) until his death on 16 March 1625.

While bishop, he was the principal consecrator of Juan de Cervantes (bishop), Bishop of Antequera, Oaxaca (1609), and Juan de Zapata y Sandoval, Bishop of Chiapas (1613).

Mota y Escobar was also one of the most prominent enslavers in the city of Puebla. In a 1610 inventory, he listed forty-two people of African and Asian descent as his enslaved property, which included several children. In these practices, he was typical of the creole elites of mid-colonial Mexico (the viceroyalty of New Spain).

== External links and additional sources ==
- Cheney, David M. "Archdiocese of Guadalajara". Catholic-Hierarchy.org. (for Chronology of Bishops)) ^{[self-published]}
- Chow, Gabriel. "Metropolitan Archdiocese of Guadalajara (Mexico)". GCatholic.org. (for Chronology of Bishops) ^{[self-published]}
- Cheney, David M. "Archdiocese of Puebla de los Ángeles, Puebla". Catholic-Hierarchy.org. (for Chronology of Bishops) ^{[self-published]}
- Chow, Gabriel. "Metropolitan Archdiocese of Puebla de los Ángeles (Mexico)". GCatholic.org. (for Chronology of Bishops) ^{[self-published]}
- Cheney, David M. "Diocese of León en Nicaragua". Catholic-Hierarchy.org. (for Chronology of Bishops) ^{[self-published]}
- Chow, Gabriel. "Diocese of León (Nicaragua)". GCatholic.org. (for Chronology of Bishops) ^{[self-published]}

Catholic Church titles
Preceded by Jerónimo de Escobar	Bishop Elect of Nicaragua; 1595–1595	Succeeded by Juan Antonio Diaz de Salcedo
Preceded by Francisco Santos García de Ontiveros y Martínez	Bishop of Guadalajara; 1598–1607	Succeeded by Juan de Valle y Arredondo
Preceded by Diego de Romano y Govea	Bishop of Tlaxcala (Puebla de los Angeles); 1607–1625	Succeeded by Gutiérrez Bernardo de Quirós
