= Nostra Signora di Guadalupe e San Filippo Martire =

- Basilica of Our Lady of Guadalupe and Saint Philip the Martyr on the Aurelian Way (in English); Domini Nostræ de Guadalupe et San Phillipi Martyris in via Aurelia (in Latin)
- Click on the map for a fullscreen view
- 41°53′38″N 12°25′00″E
- Location: Via Aurelia 675, Rome
- Country: Italy
- Denomination: Roman Catholic
- Tradition: Roman rite

History
- Status: Titular church, minor basilica, national church
- Dedication: Mary, mother of Jesus (as Our Lady of Guadalupe) and Philip of Jesus
- Consecrated: 1958

Architecture
- Architect: Gianni Mazzocca
- Architectural type: Church
- Groundbreaking: 1955
- Completed: 1958

Administration
- District: Lazio
- Province: Rome

Nostra Signora di Guadalupe e San Filippo Martire in Via Aurelia (Our Lady of Guadalupe and St. Philip Martyr in Via Aurelia) is the national church of Mexico in Rome. Opened in 1958, it was established as a titular church by Pope John Paul II in 1991, with Juan Jesús Posadas Ocampo as its first titular Cardinal Priest (1991–1993). It is owned and served by the Legion of Christ.

== History ==
It was built between 1955 and 1958 by architect Gianni Mazzocca as a church to attend the Mexican community in Rome. It was consecrated by Cardinal Vicar Clemente Micara on 12 December 1958. The church is also home to a parish, established by decree of Cardinal Micara on 22 September 1960 and entrusted to the Legion of Christ. In January 1991 it was elevated to the rank of minor basilica and on 28 June 1991 it was formally made Mexico's national church and a titular church by Pope John Paul II. Juan Sandoval Iñiguez is the incumbent Cardinal Priest since 1994.

== Cardinal Priest ==
Established as a titular church on 28 June 1991.

- Juan Jesús Posadas Ocampo, 28 June 1991 (appointed)-24 May 1993 (died).
- Juan Sandoval Iñiguez, 26 November 1994 (appointed)-present.
