= Manuel Fernández de Santa Cruz =

Catholic bishop

- Bishop of Tlaxcala
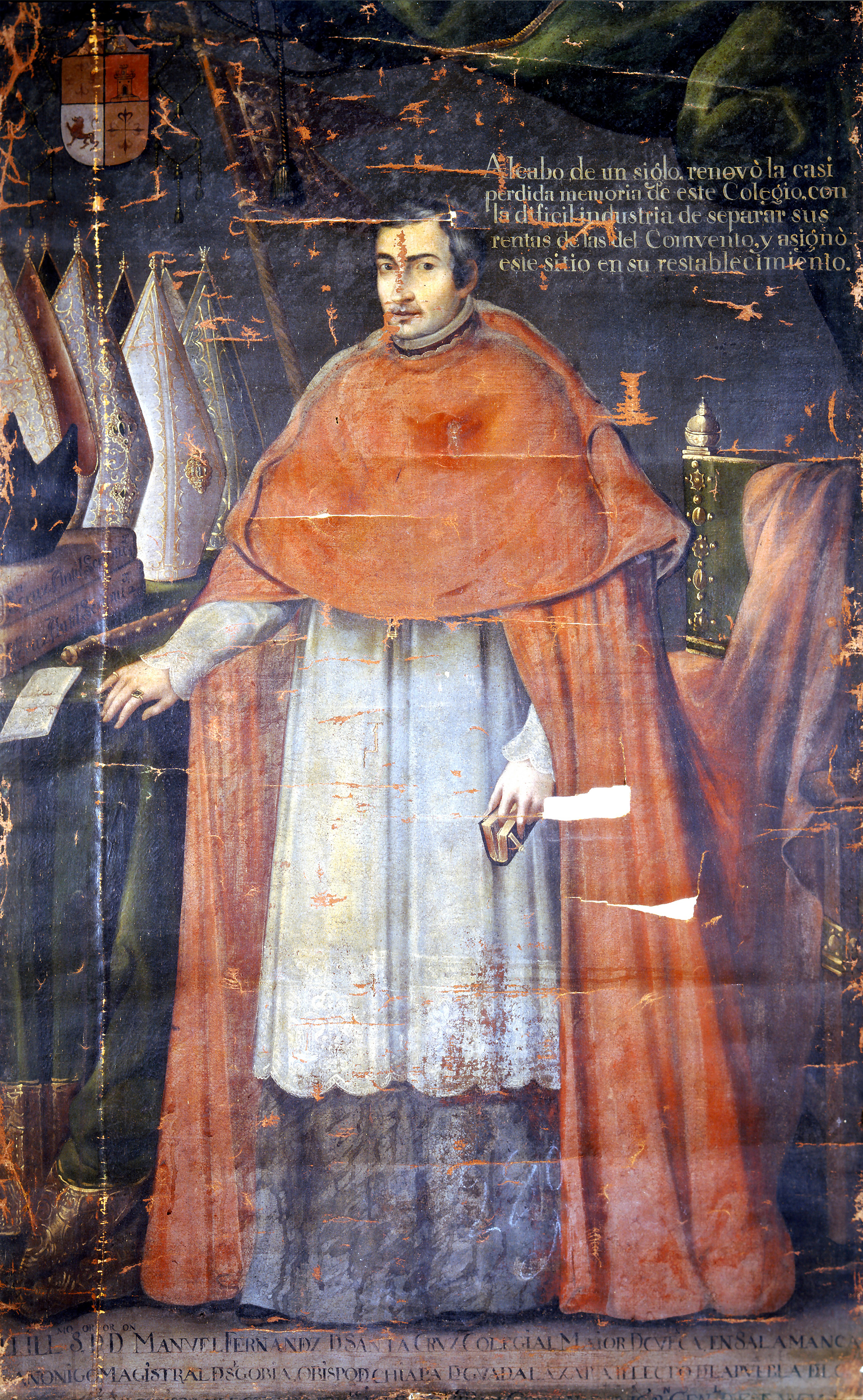
- Santa Cruz in an anonymous portrait - now in the Museo Nacional del Virreinato, Tepotzotlán, México
- Church: Catholic Church
- Diocese: Diocese of Tlaxcala
- In office: 2 June 1676 – 1 February 1699
- Predecessor: Juan de Sancto Mathía Sáenz de Mañozca y Murillo
- Successor: Ignacio de Urbina
- Previous post: Bishop of Guadalajara (1674-1676)

Orders
- Ordination: 1661
- Consecration: 24 August 1675 by Payo Enríquez de Rivera

Personal details
- Born: Manuel Fernández de Santa Cruz y Sahagún; 18 January 1637 Palencia, Kingdom of Castile, Spanish Empire
- Died: 1 February 1699 (aged 62) Puebla de los Ángeles, New Spain, Spanish Empire

Manuel Fernández de Santa Cruz y Sahagún (18 January 1637, Palencia (Spain) – 1 February 1699, Puebla (Mexico)) was a religious writer and Roman Catholic prelate who served as Bishop of Guadalajara (19 February 1674 – 2 June 1676), and Bishop of Tlaxcala (2 June 1676 – 1 February 1699). As well as founding charitable institutions in his diocese, he published Sor Juana's Carta atenagórica (critiquing a sermon by António Vieira) - without her permission (albeit under a pseudonym) and told her to focus on religious instead of secular studies, despite agreeing with her criticisms.

== Biography ==
Manuel Fernández de Santa Cruz y Sahagún was born on January 18, 1637, in Palencia, Spain and ordained a priest in 1661. On February 19, 1674, he was selected by the King of Spain and confirmed by Pope Clement X as Bishop of Guadalajara. He was consecrated bishop by Payo Afán Enríquez de Ribera Manrique de Lara, Archbishop of México, with Juan de Ortega Cano Montañez y Patiño, Bishop of Durango as co-consecrator. He was installed on September 29, 1675. On March 31, 1676, he was selected by the King of Spain and confirmed on October 19, 1676, by Pope Innocent XI as Bishop of Tlaxcala. He was installed on August 9, 1677. He served as Bishop of Tlaxcala until his death on February 1, 1699.

== Episcopal succession ==
While bishop, he served as the Principal Consecrator of:

- Juan de Santiago y León Garabito, Bishop of Guadalajara (1678);
- Francisco de Aguiar y Seijas y Ulloa, Bishop of Michoacán (1678);
- Juan Antonio García de Palacios, Bishop of Santiago de Cuba (1678);
- Nicolás Ortiz del Puerto y Colmenares Salgado, Bishop of Antequera (1680);
- Ginés Barrientos, Auxiliary Bishop of Manila (1681);
- Francisco Núñez de la Vega, Bishop of Chiapas (1684);
- Felipe Galindo Chávez y Pineda, Bishop of Guadalajara (1695);
- Diego Camacho y Ávila, Archbishop of Manila (1696); and
- Antonio de Arriaga y Agüero, Bishop of Yucatán (1698).

== External links and additional sources ==
- Cheney, David M. "Archdiocese of Guadalajara". Catholic-Hierarchy.org. (for Chronology of Bishops) ^{[self-published]}
- Chow, Gabriel. "Metropolitan Archdiocese of Guadalajara". GCatholic.org. (for Chronology of Bishops) ^{[self-published]}
- Cheney, David M. "Archdiocese of Puebla de los Ángeles, Puebla". Catholic-Hierarchy.org. (for Chronology of Bishops) ^{[self-published]}
- Chow, Gabriel. "Metropolitan Archdiocese of Puebla de los Ángeles (Mexico)". GCatholic.org. (for Chronology of Bishops) ^{[self-published]}
- http://www.upo.es/depa/webdhuma/areas/arte/actas/3cibi/documentos/006f.pdf

Catholic Church titles
Preceded by Francisco Verdín y Molina	Bishop of Guadalajara; 1674–1676	Succeeded by Juan de Santiago y León Garabito
Preceded by Juan de Sancto Mathía Sáenz de Mañozca y Murillo	Bishop of Tlaxcala; 1676–1699	Succeeded by Ignacio de Urbina
