= Francisco Gómez de Mendiola y Solórzano =

Roman Catholic prelate

Most Reverend Francisco Gómez de Mendiola y Solórzano
- Bishop of Guadalajara
- Church: Catholic Church
- Diocese: Diocese of Guadalajara
- Predecessor: Pedro de Ayala
- Successor: Domingo de Alzola

Orders
- Consecration: December 12, 1574 by Pedro Moya de Contreras

Personal details
- Born: January 19, 1519 Durango, Spain
- Died: April 23, 1576 (age 57) Guadalajara, Mexico

Francisco Gómez de Mendiola y Solórzano (January 19, 1519 – April 23, 1576) was a Roman Catholic prelate who served as Bishop of Guadalajara (1574-1576).

== Biography ==
Francisco Gómez de Mendiola y Solórzano was born in Durango, Spain. On April 19, 1574, he was appointed by the King of Spain and confirmed by Pope Gregory XIII as Bishop of Guadalajara. On December 12, 1574, he was consecrated bishop by Pedro Moya de Contreras, Archbishop of Mexico. He served as Bishop of Guadalajara until his death on April 23, 1576.

== External links and additional sources ==
- Cheney, David M. "Archdiocese of Guadalajara". Catholic-Hierarchy.org. (for Chronology of Bishops)^{self-published}
- Chow, Gabriel. "Metropolitan Archdiocese of Guadalajara". GCatholic.org. (for Chronology of Bishops)^{self-published}

Religious titles
Preceded by Pedro de Ayala	Bishop of Guadalajara; 1574-1576	Succeeded by Domingo de Alzola
