= Juan de Santiago y León Garabito =

Roman Catholic prelate

Most Reverend Juan de Santiago y León Garabito
- Bishop of Guadalajara
- Church: Catholic Church
- Diocese: Diocese of Guadalajara
- In office: 1677–1694
- Predecessor: Manuel Fernández de Santa Cruz y Sahagún
- Successor: Felipe Galindo Chávez y Pineda
- Previous post: Bishop of Puerto Rico (1676–1677)

Orders
- Consecration: May 22, 1678 by Manuel Fernández de Santa Cruz y Sahagún

Personal details
- Born: July 13, 1641 Palma del Río, Spain
- Died: July 12, 1694 (age 52) Guadalajara, Mexico

Juan de Santiago y León Garabito (July 13, 1641 – July 12, 1694) was a Roman Catholic prelate who served as Bishop of Guadalajara (1677–1694) and Bishop of Puerto Rico (1676–1677).

== Biography ==
Juan de Santiago y León Garabitoa was born in Archidona, Spain. In 1676, he was appointed by the King of Spain as Bishop of Puerto Rico. On June 7, 1677, he was selected by the King of Spain and confirmed by Pope Innocent XI on September 13, 1677 as Bishop of Guadalajara. On May 22, 1678, he was consecrated bishop by Manuel Fernández de Santa Cruz y Sahagún, Bishop of Tlaxcala. He served as Bishop of Guadalajara until his death on July 12, 1694.

== External links and additional sources ==
- Cheney, David M. "Archdiocese of San Juan de Puerto Rico". Catholic-Hierarchy.org. (for Chronology of Bishops) ^{[self-published]}
- Chow, Gabriel. "Metropolitan Archdiocese of San Juan de Puerto Rico". GCatholic.org. (for Chronology of Bishops) ^{[self-published]}
- Cheney, David M. "Archdiocese of Guadalajara". Catholic-Hierarchy.org. (for Chronology of Bishops) ^{[self-published]}
- Chow, Gabriel. "Metropolitan Archdiocese of Guadalajara". GCatholic.org. (for Chronology of Bishops) ^{[self-published]}

Religious titles
Preceded by Bartolomé Garcia de Escañuela	Bishop of Puerto Rico; 1676–1677	Succeeded by Marcos de Sobremonte
Preceded by Manuel Fernández de Santa Cruz y Sahagún	Bishop of Guadalajara; 1676–1684	Succeeded by Felipe Galindo Chávez y Pineda
