= José María de Jesús Portugal y Serratos =

19th century Mexican clergyman

José María de Jesús Portugal y Serratos OFM Obs.
- Bishop of Aguascalientes
- Church: Catholic Church
- Diocese: Diocese of Aguascalientes
- In office: 30 May 1902 – 27 November 1912
- Predecessor: Diocese erected
- Successor: Ignacio Valdespino y Díaz
- Previous posts: Bishop of Saltillo (1898-1902); Bishop of Sinaloa (1888-1898)

Orders
- Ordination: 16 June 1861
- Consecration: 8 December 1888 by Pedro José de Jesús Loza y Pardavé

Personal details
- Born: 24 January 1838 Mexico City, Federal District, Mexican Republic
- Died: 27 November 1912 (aged 74)

José María de Jesús Portugal y Serratos (born 1838 in Mexico City) was a Mexican clergyman and prelate for Sinaloa, Saltillo, and then the Roman Catholic Diocese of Aguascalientes. He was appointed bishop in 1888, 1898, and then 1902. He died in 1912.
