= Leonel de Cervantes y Caravajal =

Most Reverend Leonel de Cervantes y Caravajal
- Bishop of Antequera
- Church: Catholic Church
- Diocese: Diocese of Antequera, Oaxaca
- In office: 1636–1637
- Predecessor: Juan Bartolome de Bohórquez e Hinojosa
- Successor: Bartolomé de Benavente y Benavides
- Previous posts: Bishop of Santa Marta (1621–1625); Bishop of Santiago de Cuba (1625–1629); Bishop of Guadalajara (1629–1636)

Orders
- Consecration: 15 July 1622 by Hernando de Arias y Ugarte

Personal details
- Born: Mexico
- Died: 1637 Antequera, Oaxaca, Mexico

Leonel de Cervantes y Caravajal (died 1637) was a Roman Catholic prelate who served as Bishop of Antequera (1636–1637), Bishop of Guadalajara (1629–1636), Bishop of Santiago de Cuba (1625–1629), and Bishop of Santa Marta (1621–1625).

== Biography ==
Leonel de Cervantes y Caravajal was born in Mexico. On 17 March 1621, Leonel de Cervantes y Caravajal was appointed during the papacy of Pope Gregory XV as Bishop of Santa Marta. On 15 July 1622, he was consecrated bishop by Hernando de Arias y Ugarte, Archbishop of Santafé en Nueva Granada. On 1 December 1625, he was appointed during the papacy of Pope Urban VIII as Bishop of Santiago de Cuba. On 17 December 1629, he was appointed during the papacy of Pope Urban VIII as Bishop of Guadalajara and installed on 26 June 1631. On 18 February 1636, he was appointed during the papacy of Pope Urban VIII as Bishop of Antequera. He served as Bishop of Antequera until his death in 1637.

== External links and additional sources ==
- Cheney, David M. "Archdiocese of Antequera, Oaxaca". Catholic-Hierarchy.org. (for Chronology of Bishops) ^{[self-published]}
- Chow, Gabriel. "Metropolitan Archdiocese of Antequera (Mexico)". GCatholic.org. (for Chronology of Bishops) ^{[self-published]}
- Cheney, David M. "Archdiocese of Guadalajara". Catholic-Hierarchy.org. (for Chronology of Bishops) ^{[self-published]}
- Chow, Gabriel. "Metropolitan Archdiocese of Guadalajara (Mexico)". GCatholic.org. (for Chronology of Bishops) ^{[self-published]}
- Cheney, David M. "Archdiocese of Santiago de Cuba". Catholic-Hierarchy.org. (for Chronology of Bishops) ^{[self-published]}
- Chow, Gabriel. "Metropolitan Archdiocese of Santiago". GCatholic.org. (for Chronology of Bishops) ^{[self-published]}
- Cheney, David M. "Diocese of Santa Marta". Catholic-Hierarchy.org. (for Chronology of Bishops) ^{[self-published]}
- Chow, Gabriel. "Metropolitan Diocese of Santa Marta (Colombia)". GCatholic.org. (for Chronology of Bishops) ^{[self-published]}

Catholic Church titles
| Preceded by Sebastián Ocando | Bishop of Santa Marta; 1621–1625 | Succeeded by Lucas García Miranda |
| Preceded by Gregorio de Alarcón | Bishop of Santiago de Cuba; 1625–1629 | Succeeded by Jerónimo Manrique de Lara y de Herrera |
| Preceded by Francisco de Rivera y Pareja | Bishop of Guadalajara; 1629–1636 | Succeeded by Juan Sánchez Duque de Estrada |
| Preceded by Juan Bartolome de Bohórquez e Hinojosa | Bishop of Antequera; 1636–1637 | Succeeded by Bartolomé de Benavente y Benavides |
