= Jerónimo de Escobar =

Most Reverend Jerónimo de Escobar
- Bishop of Nicaragua
- Church: Catholic Church
- Diocese: Diocese of Nicaragua
- In office: 1592–1593
- Predecessor: Domingo de Ulloa
- Successor: Alfonso de la Mota y Escobar

Orders
- Consecration: 22 May 1592

Personal details
- Born: 1525 Toledo, Spain
- Died: 19 March 1593 (aged 67–68) Cádiz, Spain

Jerónimo de Escobar (1525 – 19 March 1593) was a Roman Catholic prelate who served as Bishop of Nicaragua (1592–1593).

== Biography ==
Jerónimo de Escobar was born in Toledo, Spain and ordained a priest in the Order of Saint Augustine. On 22 May 1592, he was appointed during the papacy of Pope Clement VIII as Bishop of Nicaragua and consecrated bishop on 26 July 1592 in Spain. He served as Bishop of Nicaragua until his death on 19 March 1593 in Cadiz, Spain.

== External links and additional sources ==
- Cheney, David M. "Diocese of León en Nicaragua". Catholic-Hierarchy.org. (for Chronology of Bishops) ^{[self-published]}
- Chow, Gabriel. "Diocese of León (Nicaragua)". GCatholic.org. (for Chronology of Bishops) ^{[self-published]}

Catholic Church titles
Preceded by Domingo de Ulloa	Bishop of Nicaragua; 1592–1593	Succeeded by Alfonso de la Mota y Escobar
