= Antonius de Ciudad Rodrigo =

Bishop of Guadalajara from 1552 to 1553

Most Reverend Antonius de Ciudad Rodrigo
- Bishop of Guadalajara
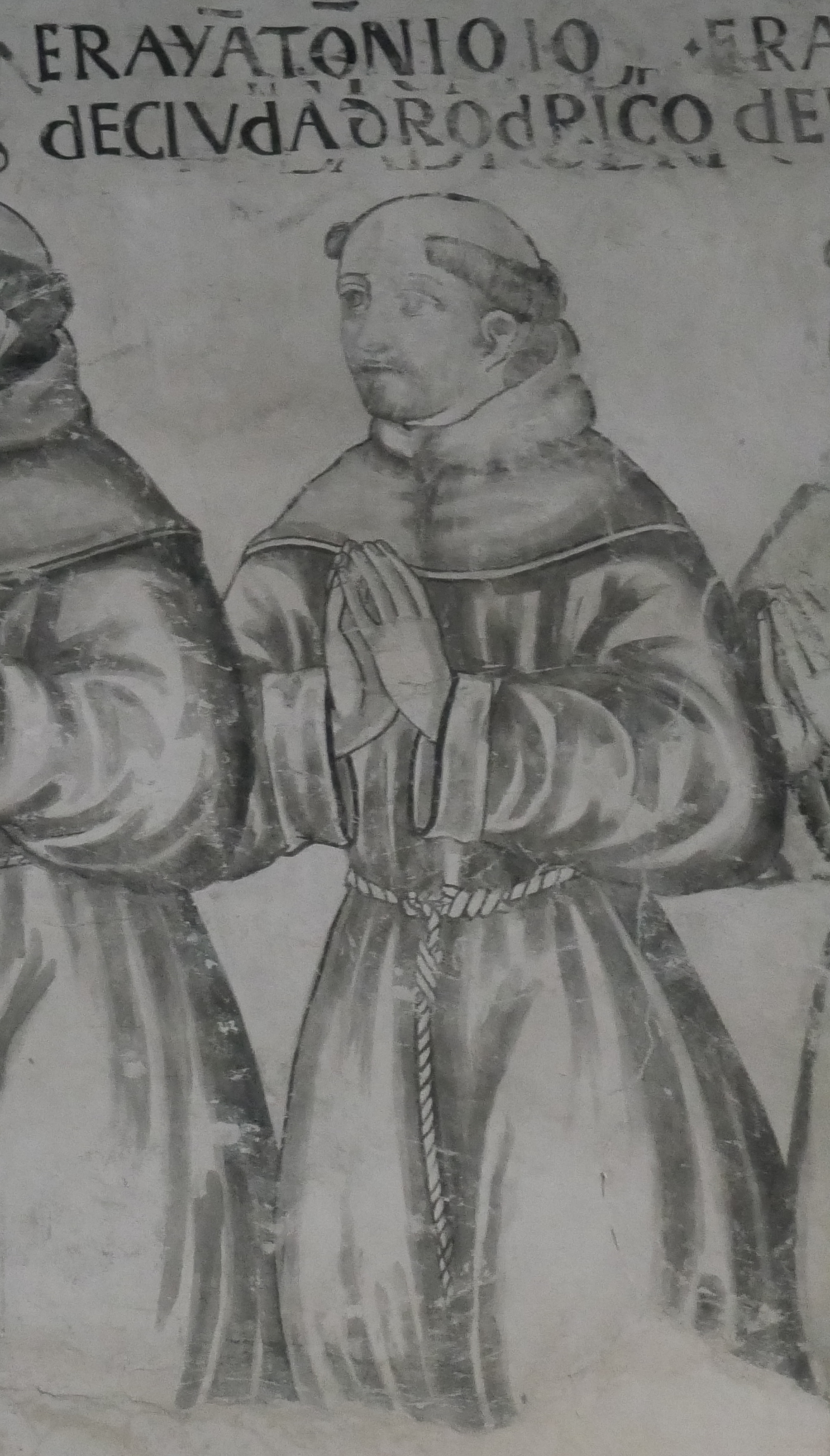
- Church: Catholic Church
- Diocese: Diocese of Guadalajara
- In office: 1552–1553
- Predecessor: Pedro Gómez Malaver
- Successor: Pedro de Ayala

Personal details
- Died: 13 September 1553 Guadalajara, Mexico

Antonius de Ciudad Rodrigo (died 13 September 1553) was a Roman Catholic prelate who served as the second Bishop of Guadalajara (1552–1553).

== Biography ==
Antonius de Ciudad Rodrigo was ordained a priest in the Order of Friars Minor. In 1552, he was appointed by the King of Spain and confirmed by Pope Julius III as the second Bishop of Guadalajara. He served as Bishop of Guadalajara until his death on 13 September 1553.

== External links and additional sources ==
- Cheney, David M. "Archdiocese of Guadalajara". Catholic-Hierarchy.org. (for Chronology of Bishops)^{self-published}
- Chow, Gabriel. "Metropolitan Archdiocese of Guadalajara". GCatholic.org. (for Chronology of Bishops)^{self-published}

Religious titles
Preceded by Pedro Gómez Malaver	Bishop of Guadalajara; 1552–1553	Succeeded by Pedro de Ayala
