= Santuario de los Mártires de Cristo Rey =

Coordinates: 20.6151°N 103.4059°W

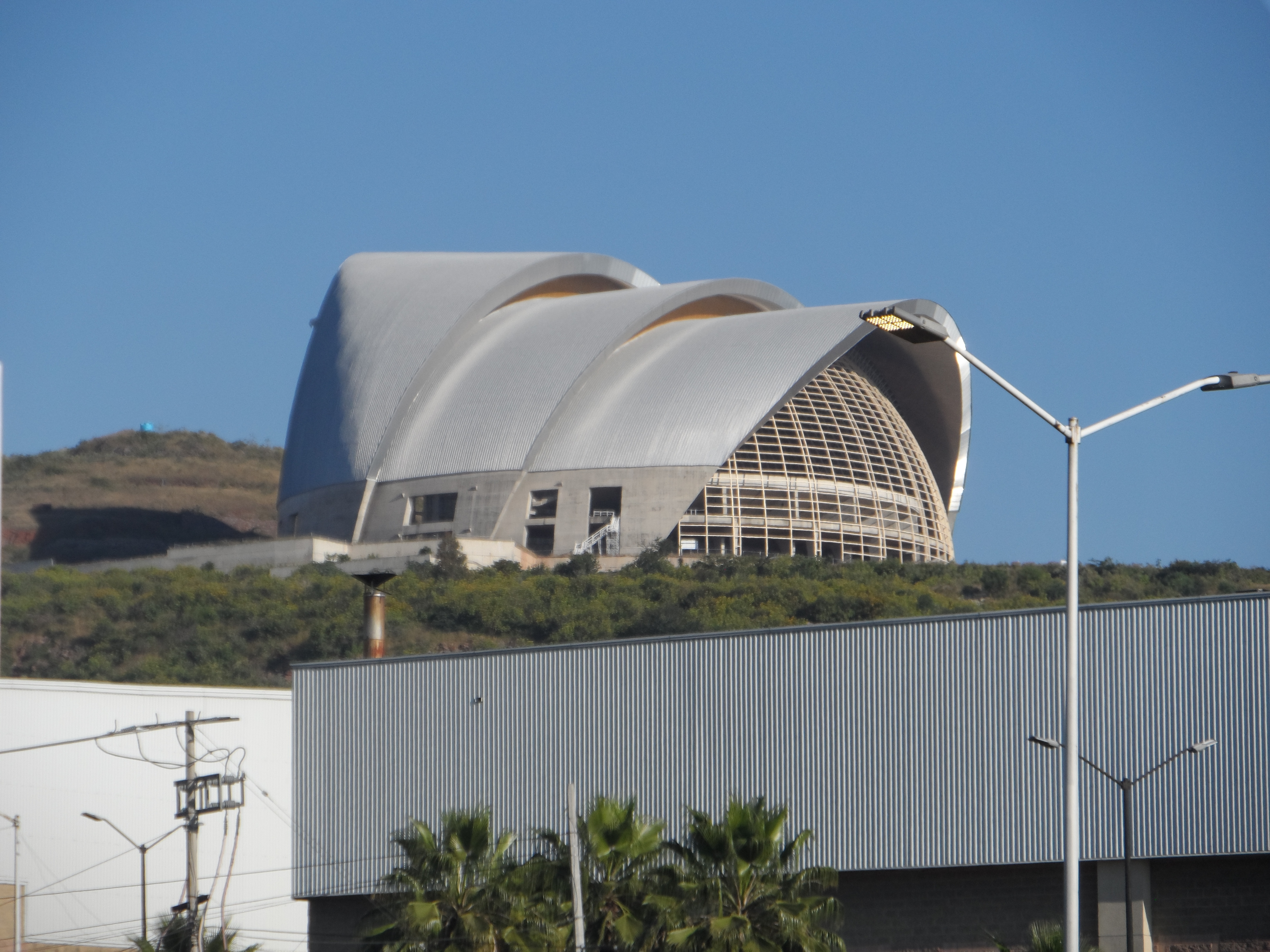
- Santuario de los Mártires de Cristo Rey
- Location: Tlaquepaque
- Address: Cerro del Tesoro, 45608
- Country: Mexico

Administration
- Archdiocese: Archdiocese of Guadalajara

Santuario de los Mártires de Cristo Rey is a religious monument located in Tlaquepaque, Jalisco, Mexico. This building was erected in honor of the Mexican martyrs who lost their lives during the Cristero War, an armed conflict between 1926 and 1929 (although some clashes continued into the early 1930s) in response to the anti-religious policies of the Mexican government. The Sanctuary of the Martyrs of Christ the King attracts numerous pilgrims and visitors, both national and international. It is a place of reflection, prayer, and tribute. The sanctuary is located in Cerro del Tesoro in Tlaquepaque, Guadalajara.

== History ==
=== The Cristero War (1926–1929) ===
This war arose as a result of tensions between the post-revolutionary Mexican government and the Catholic Church. The Reform Laws and later the Constitution of 1917 attempted to reduce the power and influence of the Church in national affairs. These regulations affected church property, religious education, and the number of priests in the country.

In 1926, under the government of Plutarco Elías Calles, the "Calles Law" was enacted, which further reinforced restrictions on the Catholic Church. As a result, many Catholics felt that their faith and rights were being threatened.

Armed resistance began as a response to these policies. Those who took up arms against the government adopted the cry of "Long live Christ the King!", and hence the name "Cristeros" for the rebels.

During the conflict, many priests, lay people and Catholic sympathizers were killed due to their resistance against the government's anti-clerical policies

=== The Santuario de los Mártires de Cristo Rey ===
Although the Cristero War officially ended in 1929, its effects and memories have persisted in the collective memory of many Mexicans.

The Shrine of the Martyrs of Christ the King was conceptualized as a monument and place of worship dedicated to those who gave their lives during this conflict for their religious beliefs.

The project to build the sanctuary began in the first decade of the 21st century, and its construction represented an act of reconciliation and reminder of the importance of freedom of worship and peace.

The sanctuary, located in Guadalajara, Jalisco, is a testimony of the faith and resistance of the Cristeros. It serves not only as a place of prayer and reflection, but also as an educational space where visitors can learn about this crucial time in Mexican history.
