= Francisco de Rivera y Pareja =

Spanish Roman Catholic prelate

Most Reverend Francisco de Rivera y Pareja
- Bishop of Michoacán
- Church: Catholic Church
- Diocese: Diocese of Michoacán
- In office: 1629–1637
- Predecessor: Alonso Orozco Enriquez de Armendáriz Castellanos y Toledo
- Successor: Marcos Ramírez de Prado y Ovando
- Previous post: Bishop of Guadalajara (1618–1629)

Orders
- Ordination: 1582
- Consecration: October 28, 1618 by Juan Pérez de la Serna

Personal details
- Born: 1561 Alcalá de Henares, Spain
- Died: October 8, 1637 (age 76) Guadalajara, Mexico

Francisco de Rivera y Pareja (1561 – October 8, 1637) was a Roman Catholic prelate who served as Bishop of Michoacán (1629–1637) and Bishop of Guadalajara (1618–1629).

== Biography ==
Francisco de Rivera y Pareja was born in Alcalá de Henares, Spain and ordained a priest in the Order of Our Lady of Mercy in 1582. On January 29, 1618, he was appointed by the King of Spain and confirmed by Pope Paul V as Bishop of Guadalajara. On October 28, 1618, he was consecrated bishop by Juan Pérez de la Serna, Archbishop of Mexico. On September 17, 1629, he was appointed by the King of Spain and confirmed by Pope Urban VIII as Bishop of Michoacán. He served as Bishop of Michoacán until his death on October 8, 1637.

== External links and additional sources ==
- Cheney, David M. "Archdiocese of Guadalajara". Catholic-Hierarchy.org. (for Chronology of Bishops) ^{[self-published]}
- Chow, Gabriel. "Metropolitan Archdiocese of Guadalajara (Mexico)". Gcatholic. (for Chronology of Bishops) ^{[self-published]}
- Cheney, David M. "Archdiocese of Morelia". Catholic-Hierarchy.org. (for Chronology of Bishops) ^{[self-published]}
- Chow, Gabriel. "Metropolitan Archdiocese of Morelia (Mexico)". GCatholic.org. (for Chronology of Bishops) ^{[self-published]}

Religious titles
| Preceded by Juan de Valle y Arredondo | Bishop of Guadalajara; 1618–1629 | Succeeded by Leonel de Cervantes y Caravajal |
| Preceded by Alonso Orozco Enriquez de Armendáriz Castellanos y Toledo | Bishop of Michoacán; 1629–1637 | Succeeded by Marcos Ramírez de Prado y Ovando |
