= Pedro Suarez de Escobar =

Most Reverend Pedro Suarez de Escobar
- Bishop elect of Guadalajara
- Church: Catholic Church
- Diocese: Diocese of Guadalajara
- In office: 1591
- Predecessor: Domingo de Alzola
- Successor: Francisco Santos García de Ontiveros y Martínez

Personal details
- Born: Medellín, Spain
- Died: 1591

Pedro Suarez de Escobar, O.S.A. (died 1591) was a Roman Catholic prelate who served as Bishop elect of Guadalajara (1591).

== Biography ==
Pedro Suarez de Escobar was born in Medellín, Badajoz and ordained a priest in the Order of Saint Augustine. In 1591, he was appointed during the papacy of Pope Gregory XIV as Bishop of Guadalajara. He died before he was consecrated in the same year.

== External links and additional sources ==
- Cheney, David M. "Archdiocese of Guadalajara". Catholic-Hierarchy.org. (for Chronology of Bishops)^{self-published}
- Chow, Gabriel. "Metropolitan Archdiocese of Guadalajara". GCatholic.org. (for Chronology of Bishops)^{self-published}

Catholic Church titles
Preceded by Domingo de Alzola	Bishop of Guadalajara; 1591	Succeeded by Francisco Santos García de Ontiveros y Martínez
