= San Miguel del Arroyo =

Coordinates: 41°26′N 4°27′W

San Miguel del Arroyo, Spain
- Flag Coat of arms

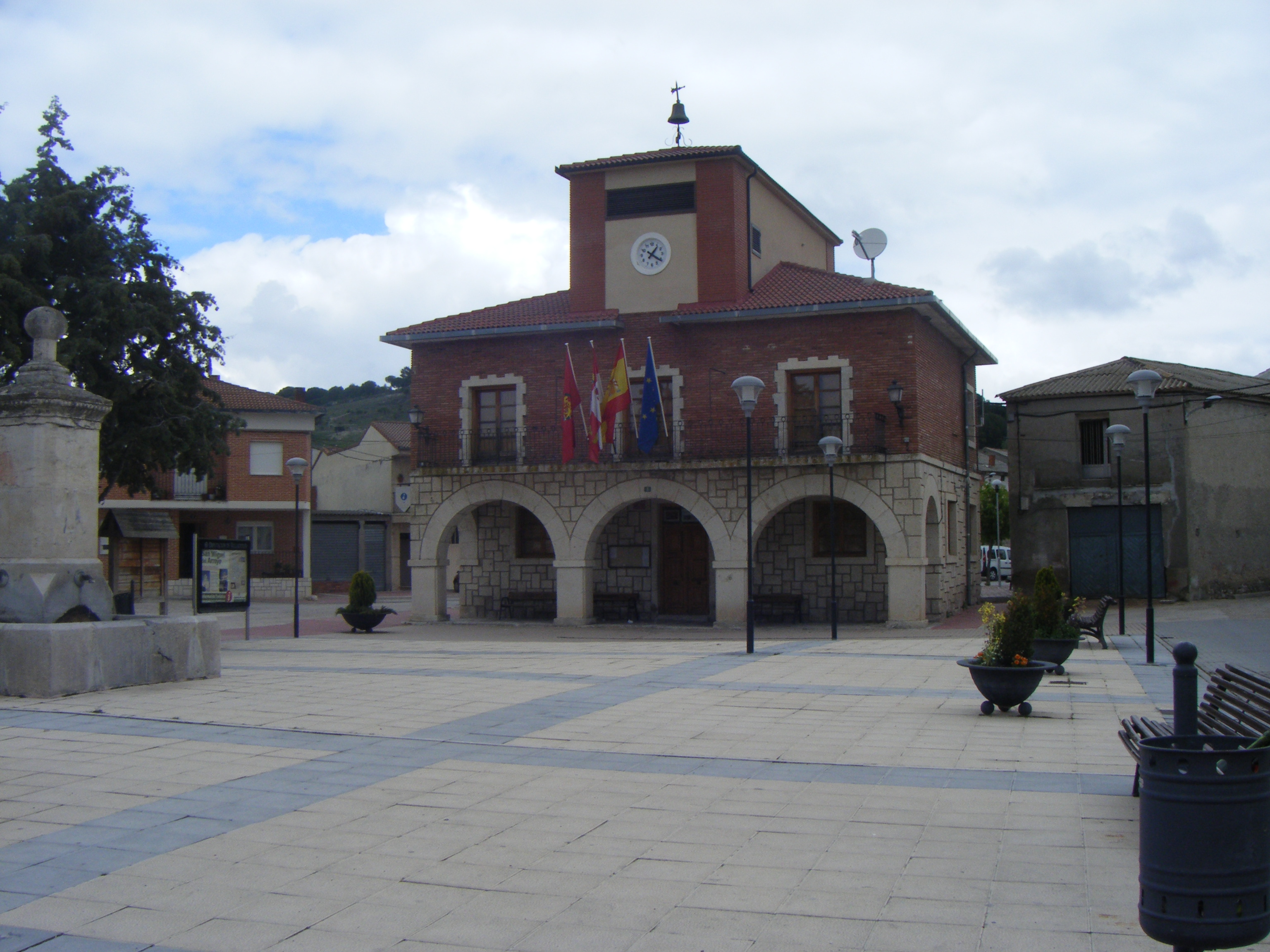
- Country: Spain
- Autonomous community: Castile and León
- Province: Valladolid
- Municipality: San Miguel del Arroyo

Area
  - Total: 55 km^{2} (21 sq mi)

Population (2025-01-01)
  - Total: 641
  - Density: 12/km^{2} (30/sq mi)
- Time zone: UTC+1 (CET)
  - Summer (DST): UTC+2 (CEST)

San Miguel del Arroyo is a municipality located in the province of Valladolid, Castile and León, Spain. According to the 2004 census (INE), the municipality has a population of 785 inhabitants.
