= Juan Avellaneda Manrique =

Roman Catholic prelate

Most Reverend Juan Avellaneda Manrique
- Auxiliary Bishop of Toledo; Titular Bishop of Sidon
- Church: Catholic Church
- Archdiocese: Archdiocese of Toledo
- In office: 1611–1619?

Juan Avellaneda Manrique was a Roman Catholic prelate who served as Auxiliary Bishop of Toledo (1611–1619?) and Titular Bishop of Sidon.

== Biography ==
On 30 May 1611, Juan Avellaneda Manrique was appointed during the papacy of Pope Paul V as Auxiliary Bishop of Toledo and Titular Bishop of Sidon. While bishop, he was the principal co-consecrator of Francisco González Zárate, Bishop of Cartagena (1616); and Baltasar Moscoso y Sandoval, Bishop of Jaén (1619).

== See also ==
- Catholic Church in Spain

== External links and additional sources ==
- Cheney, David M. "Sidon (Titular See)". Catholic-Hierarchy.org. (for Chronology of Bishops) ^{[self-published]}
- Chow, Gabriel. "Titular Episcopal See of Sidon (Lebanon)". GCatholic.org. (for Chronology of Bishops) ^{[self-published]}
