= Santa Maria della Presentazione, Rome =

Santa Maria della Presentazione
- St. Mary of the Presentation (in English); S. Mariæ de Presentatione (in Latin)
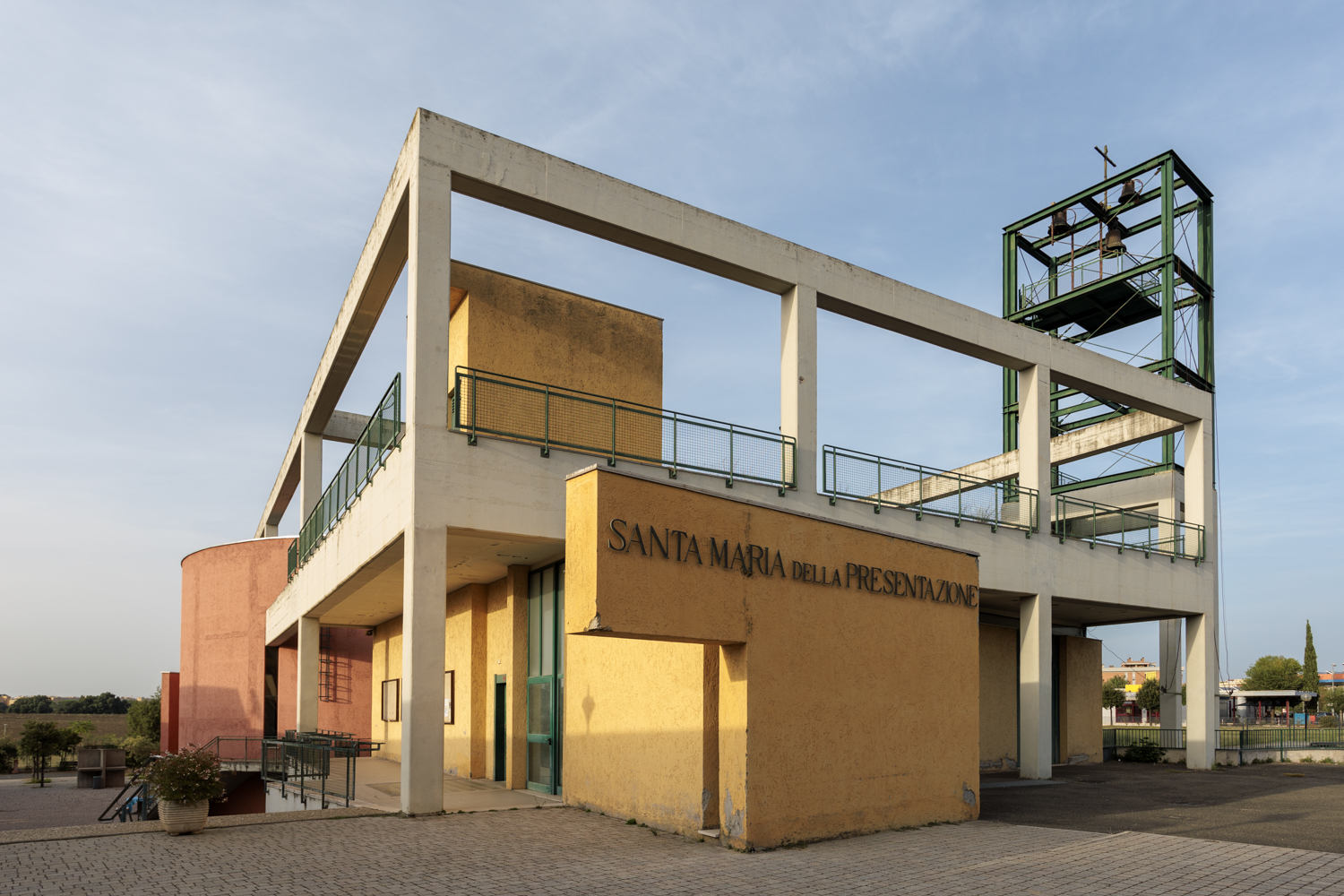
- Click on the map for a fullscreen view
- 41°54′44″N 12°24′04″E
- Location: Via di Torrevecchia 1104, Rome
- Country: Italy
- Denomination: Roman Catholic
- Tradition: Roman Rite
- Website: Official website

History
- Status: Titular church
- Dedication: Mary, mother of Jesus (as Our Lady of the Presentation)

Architecture
- Architect(s): Glauco and Roberto Ghesleri
- Architectural type: Church
- Style: Modernist

Administration
- District: Lazio
- Province: Rome

St. Mary of the Presentation Church is a church located in Diocese of Rome, in via Torrevechia, Primavalle, a district of Rome.

Pope Benedict XVI instituted it as the seat of the cardinal title of S. Mariæ de Presentatione.

== List of Cardinal Protectors ==
- Francisco Robles Ortega 24 November 2007 – present
