= Autlán Cathedral =

Coordinates: 19.7727°N 104.3644°W

Holy Trinity Cathedral
- Catedral de la Santisima Trinidad
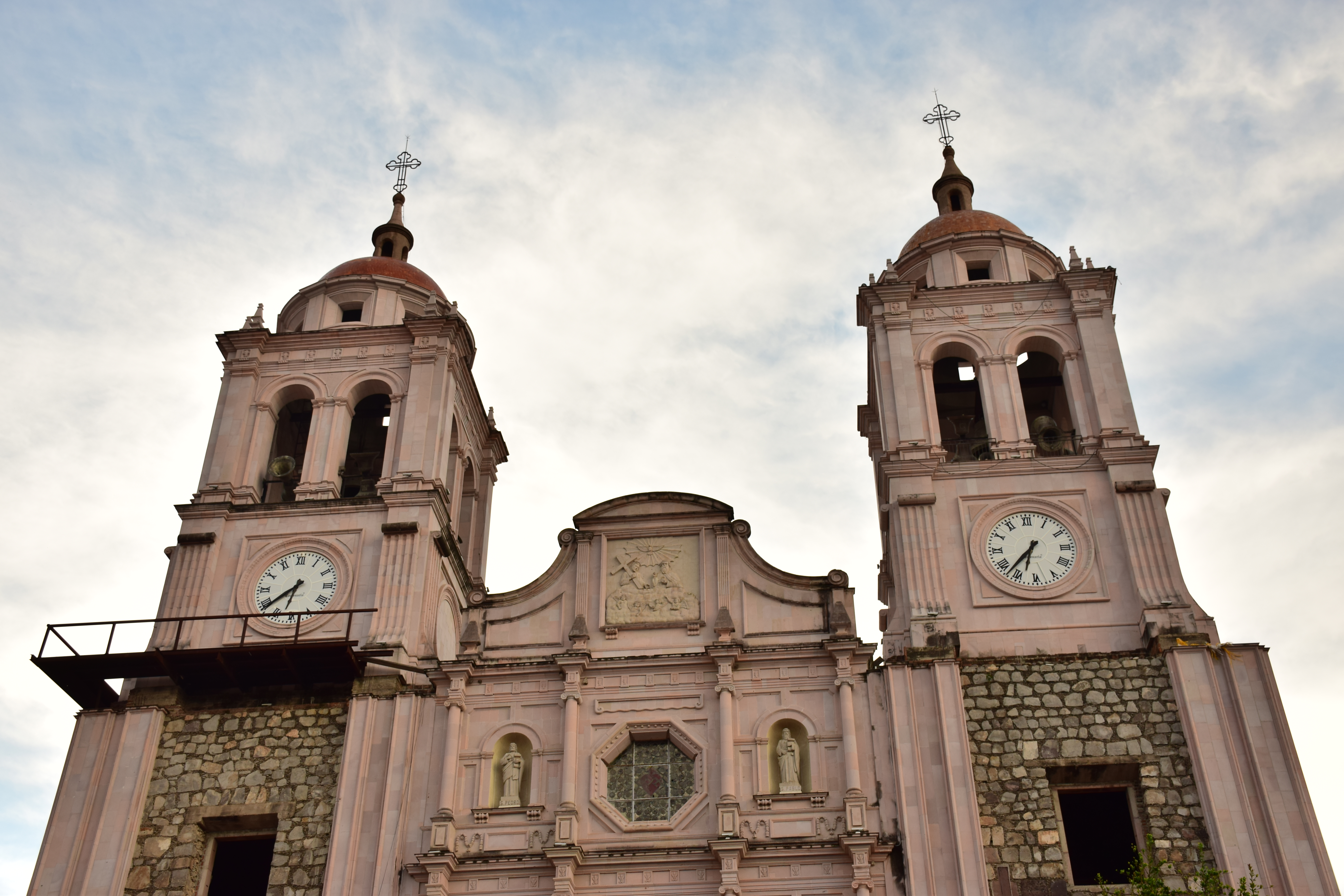
- Holy Trinity Cathedral
- Location: Autlán
- Country: Mexico
- Denomination: Roman Catholic Church

The Holy Trinity Cathedral (Spanish: Catedral de la Santisima Trinidad) Also Autlán Cathedral Is a religious building of the Catholic Church that functions as the headquarters of the Diocese of Autlán in Mexico. Raised in the late nineteenth century, the structure had a slow build.

The works were interrupted and resumed on several occasions, the most important of all in 1961, a year after being designated as the site of the Diocese of Autlán, by the first bishop, Miguel González Ibarra, who closed the vaults of The ship and completed the towers.

By the end of 2005, the main façade had been completed. The temple of plant of Latin cross, shows a single ship and cruise, on which the octagonal dome rises, covered in the outside by tiles.

== See also ==
- Roman Catholicism in Mexico
