= Budia =

Budia, Spain
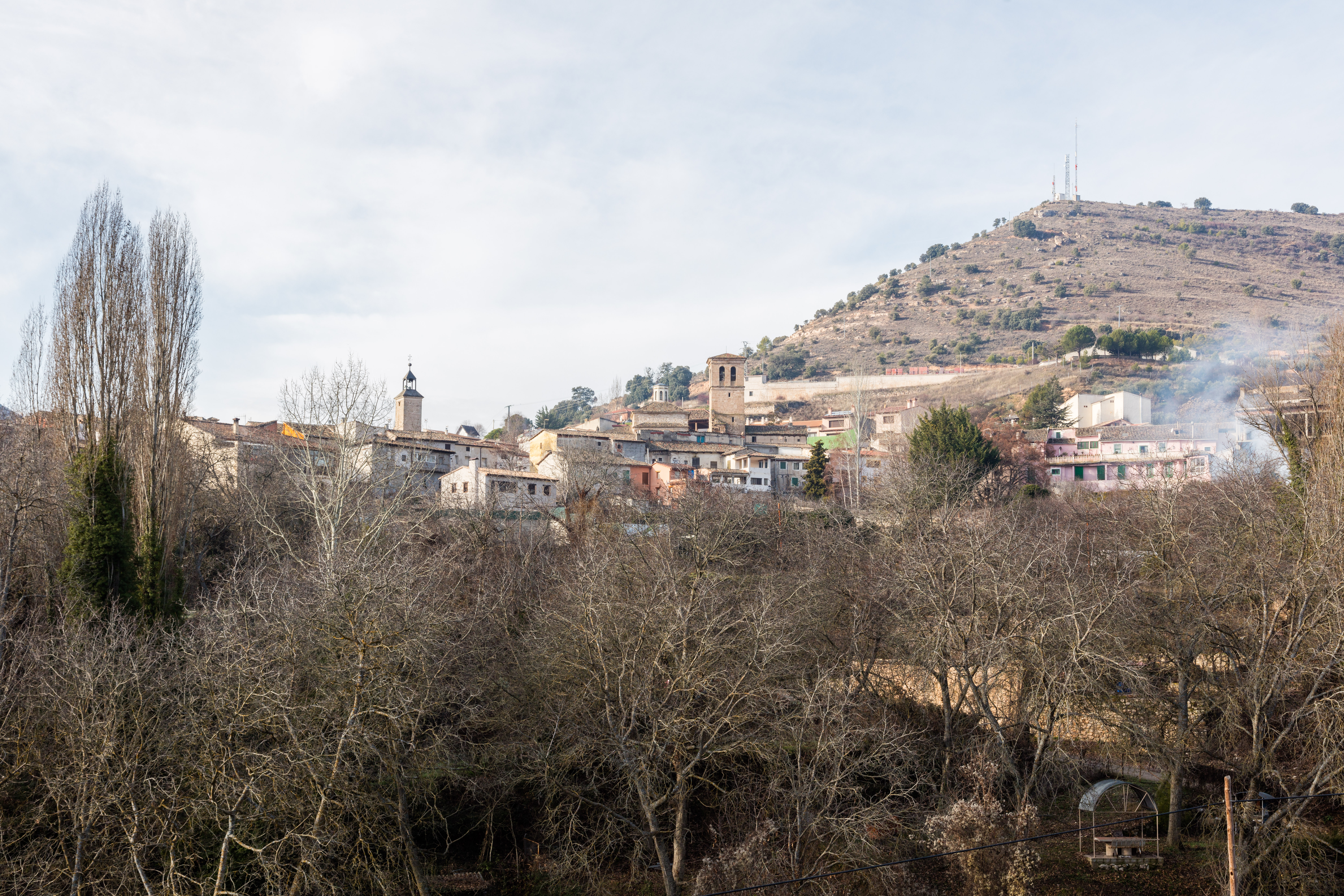

- Coat of arms

- Location within Province of Guadalajara Location within Castilla-La Mancha Location within Spain
- Coordinates: 40°37′59″N 2°45′00″W
- Country: Spain
- Autonomous community: Castile-La Mancha
- Province: Guadalajara
- Municipality: Budia

Area
  - Total: 666 km^{2} (257 sq mi)

Population (2025-01-01)
  - Total: 226
  - Density: 0.339/km^{2} (0.879/sq mi)
- Time zone: UTC+1 (CET)
  - Summer (DST): UTC+2 (CEST)

Budia (Spanish pronunciation: [ˈbu.ðja]) is a municipality located in the province of Guadalajara, Castile-La Mancha, Spain. According to the 2004 census (INE), the municipality has a population of 214 inhabitants.

Budia contains the ruins of a Carmelite convent, built in the 17th century and used as a convent until 1835. As of 2019 there was a local effort underway to get funding to restore the ruins
