= Francisco Robles Ortega =

Mexican Catholic cardinal (born 1949)

His Eminence José Francisco Robles Ortega
- Cardinal, Archbishop of Guadalajara
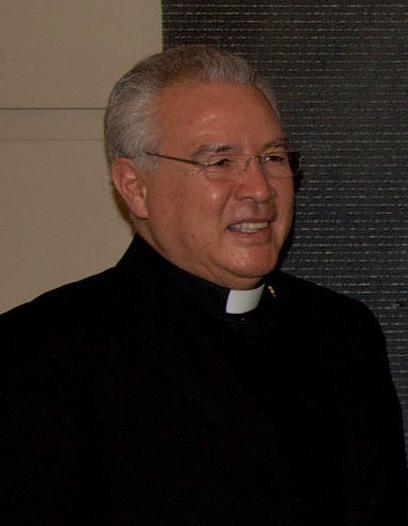
- Province: Guadalajara
- See: Guadalajara
- Appointed: 7 December 2011
- Installed: 7 February 2012
- Predecessor: Juan Sandoval Íñiguez
- Other post: Cardinal-Priest of Santa Maria della Presentazione
- Previous posts: Auxiliary Bishop of Toluca (1991–1996); Titular Bishop of Bossa (1991–1996); Bishop of Toluca (1996–2003); Archbishop of Monterrey (2003–2011)

Orders
- Ordination: 20 July 1976 by José Maclovio Vásquez Silos
- Consecration: 5 June 1991 by Alfredo Torres Romero
- Created cardinal: 24 November 2007 by Pope Benedict XVI
- Rank: Cardinal-Priest

Personal details
- Born: José Francisco Robles Ortega; 2 March 1949 (age 77) Mascota, Mexico
- Denomination: Roman Catholic
- Motto: In simplicitate fidei (in the simplicity of faith)
- Coat of arms

Francisco Robles Ortega (Spanish pronunciation: [fɾanˈsisko ˈro.βles oɾˈteɣa]; born 2 March 1949) is a Mexican prelate of the Catholic Church who has been Archbishop of Guadalajara since 2012 and a cardinal since 2007. He was archbishop of Monterrey from 2003 to 2011. He was president of the Mexican Episcopal Conference from 2012 to 2018.

== Biography ==
=== Early life ===
Francisco Robles Ortega was born in Mascota on 2 March 1949, the third of sixteen children born to Francisco Robles Arreola (b. 1917) and Teresa Ortega de Robles (b. 1927). He studied humanities at the minor seminary in Autlán, philosophy at the seminary in Guadalajara, and theology at the seminary in Zamora. Robles was ordained to the priesthood by Bishop José Vásquez Silos on 20 July 1976.

He studied at the Pontifical Gregorian University in Rome from 1976 to 1979, obtaining his licentiate in theology. Upon his return to Autlán, he held appointments as parish vicar, prefect of studies and spiritual director at the minor seminary, and chaplain of nuns. In 1980 he became rector of the seminary. He also served as diocesan consultor and president of the priests council and a member of the Commission for the Formation of the Clergy and of the Diocesan Commission for the Doctrine of the Faith. In 1985 he was appointed vicar general of the diocese and then became assistant to the commission for economic affairs of the diocese and taught at the seminary. He was named apostolic administrator of Autlán following the death of Bishop Vásquez Silos in July 1990.

=== Bishop ===
On 30 April 1991, Robles was appointed auxiliary bishop of Toluca and Titular Bishop of Bossa by Pope John Paul II. He received his episcopal consecration on the following 5 June from Bishop Alfredo Torres Romero, with Bishops José Hernández González and Javier Lozano Barragán serving as co-consecrators, in the Cathedral of Toluca.

Robles was named diocesan administrator of Toluca following the death of Bishop Torres Romero on 15 October 1995. He was appointed bishop of Toluca on 15 June 1996 and was installed on 15 July of that same year. On 25 January 2003, he was promoted to Archbishop of Monterrey.

=== Cardinal ===
Styles of Francisco Robles Ortega
- Reference style: His Eminence
- Spoken style: Your Eminence
- Informal style: Cardinal
- See: Guadalajara

Pope Benedict XVI created him cardinal-priest of Santa Maria della Presentazione in the consistory of 24 November 2007.

On 5 January 2011 he was appointed among the first members of the newly created Pontifical Council for the Promotion of the New Evangelisation.

On 7 December 2011 Robles was appointed the Archbishop of Guadalajara.

On 24 November 2012 he was appointed a member of the Pontifical Council for Social Communications.

He was elected to a three-year term as president of the Mexican Episcopal Conference in 2012 and then elected to a second term, ending his service in 2018.

He was one of the cardinal electors who participated in the 2013 papal conclave that elected Pope Francis.

He was appointed a member of the Congregation for Bishops on 16 December 2013.

He was once again a cardinal elector in the 2025 papal conclave that elected Pope Leo XIV.

== Views ==
=== Drug politics ===
The archbishop has called on the country's political parties and organizations to take action to avoid infiltration in their ranks by drug traders.

=== Secularism in education ===
Robles said "we are against the change proposed by the decree to reform Article 3" of the Constitution because it seeks to encourage secularism in private educational institutions, eliminating the subject of religion, which trains young people in moral values.

=== Poverty and humility ===
In naming archbishop Francisco Robles of Monterrey as one of 23 new Roman Catholic cardinals, analysts say the Vatican chose a clergyman who advocates for the poor and beseeches the faithful to embrace humility.

=== Family policy ===
Robles has said that the family is "an institution that is natural, that is the basis of society", and he warned those who oppose a new law that would protect it not to attempt to "supplant such an important institution as the family."

Catholic Church titles
Titular see established	— TITULAR — Titular Bishop of Bossa; 30 April 1991 – 15 June 1996	Succeeded by John Tong Hon
Preceded by Alfredo Torres Romero	Bishop of Toluca; 15 June 1996 – 25 January 2003	Succeeded by Francisco Chavolla Ramos
Preceded by Adolfo Suárez Rivera	Archbishop of Monterrey; 25 January 2003 – 7 December 2011	Succeeded by Rogelio Cabrera López
Titular church established	Cardinal-Priest of Santa Maria della Presentazione; 24 November 2007 –	Incumbent
Preceded by Juan Sandoval Íñiguez	Archbishop of Guadalajara; 7 December 2011 –	Incumbent
Preceded by Carlos Aguiar Retes	President of the Mexican Episcopal Conference; 24 November 2012 – 13 November 2018	Succeeded by Rogelio Cabrera López
