= Archdiocese of Guadalajara =

Catholic archdiocese in Mexico

Coordinates: 20.6714°N 103.3560°W

Archdiocese of Guadalajara Archidioecesis Guadalaiarensis Arquidiócesis de Guadalajara
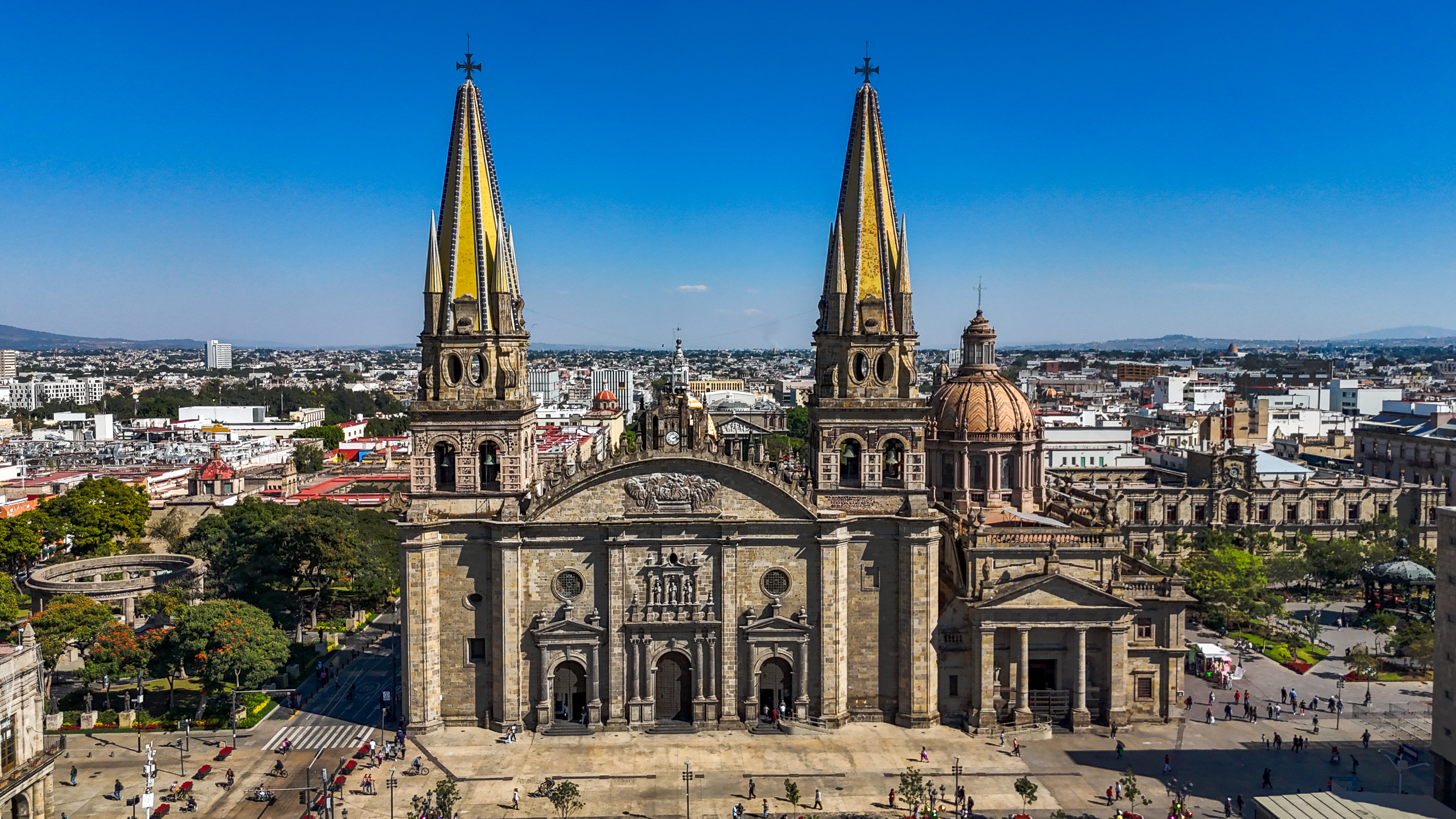
- Cathedral of the Assumption of Our Lady in Guadalajara

Location
- Country: Mexico
- Ecclesiastical province: Province of Guadalajara

Statistics
- Area: 8,044 sq mi (20,830 km^{2})
- Population: Total; Catholics: (as of 2006); 6,773,000; 6,164,000 (91%)
- Parishes: 419

Information
- Denomination: Catholic
- Sui iuris church: Latin Church
- Rite: Roman Rite
- Established: 13 July 1548 (478 years ago)
- Cathedral: Catedral de la Asunción de María Santísima

Current leadership
- Pope: Leo XIV
- Bishop: Francisco Robles Ortega
- Auxiliary Bishops: Héctor López Alvarado; Juan Manuel Muñoz Curiel, O.F.M. Engelberto Polino Sánchez; Manuel González Villaseñor; Ramón Salazar Estrada
- Bishops emeritus: Juan Sandoval Íñiguez; Miguel Romano Gómez; Juan Humberto Gutiérrez Valencia

Map

Website
- arquidiocesisgdl.org

The Archdiocese of Guadalajara (Latin: Archidioecesis Guadalaiarensis) is a Latin Catholic archdiocese of the Catholic Church based in the Mexican city of Guadalajara, Jalisco. It currently covers an area of 20,827 km² (8,044 squar miles). The diocese was erected on 13 July 1548 on territory split off from then Diocese of Michoacán, elevated to Archdiocese on 26 January 1863, and is the Metropolitan see of the suffragan sees of Aguascalientes, Autlán, Ciudad Guzmán, Colima, Jesús Maria del Nayar (a Territorial Prelature), San Juan de los Lagos and Tepic.

== Bishops ==
=== Ordinaries ===
Diocese of Guadalajara

Erected: 13 July 1548

- Pedro Gómez Malaver (Maraver) (13 Jul 1548 – 28 Dec 1551 Died)
- Antonius de Ciudad Rodrigo, O.F.M. (1552 – 13 Sep 1553 Died)
- Pedro de Ayala (bishop), O.F.M. (18 Dec 1561 – 19 Sep 1569 Died)
- Francisco Gómez de Mendiola y Solórzano (19 Apr 1574 – 23 Apr 1576 Died)
- Domingo de Alzola, O.P. (1 Oct 1582 – 15 Feb 1590 Died)
- Pedro Suarez de Escobar, O.S.A. (1591 Died Bishop-elect)
- Francisco Santos García de Ontiveros y Martínez (22 May 1592 – 28 Jun 1596 Died)
- Alfonso de la Mota y Escobar (11 Mar 1598 – 12 Feb 1607 Appointed, Bishop of Tlaxcala (Puebla de los Ángeles)
- Juan de Valle y Arredondo, O.S.B. (19 Mar 1607 – 1617 Resigned).
- Francisco de Rivera y Pareja, O. de M. (29 Jan 1618 – 17 Sep 1629 Appointed, Bishop of Michoacán)
- Leonel de Cervantes y Caravajal (17 Dec 1629 – 18 Feb 1636 Appointed, Bishop of Antequera, Oaxaca)
- Juan Sánchez Duque de Estrada (21 Jul 1636 – 12 Nov 1641 Died)
- Juan Ruiz de Colmenero (25 Jun 1646 – 28 Sep 1663 Died)
- Francisco Verdín y Molina (6 Jul 1665 – 27 Nov 1673, Appointed Bishop of Michoacán)
- Manuel Fernández de Santa Cruz y Sahagún (19 Feb 1674 – 19 Oct 1676 Confirmed, Bishop of Tlaxcala (Puebla de los Ángeles))
- Juan de Santiago y León Garabito (13 Sep 1677 – 12 Jul 1694 Died)
- Felipe Galindo Chávez y Pineda, O.P. (30 May 1695 – 7 Mar 1702 Died)
- Diego Camacho y Ávila (14 Jan 1704 – 19 Oct 1712 Died)
- Manuel de Mimbela y Morlans, O.F.M. (26 Feb 1714 – 4 May 1721 Died)
- Pedro de Tapiz y Garcia (23 Sep 1722 Appointed – Did Not Take Effect)
- Juan Bautista Alvarez de Toledo, O.F.M. (30 Aug 1723 – 1 Jul 1725 Died)
- Nicolás Carlos Gómez de Cervantes y Velázquez de la Cadena (20 Feb 1726 – 6 Nov 1734 Died)
- Juan Leandro Gómez de Parada Valdez y Mendoza (2 Dec 1735 – 14 Jan 1751 Died)
- José Francisco Martínez de Tejada y Díez de Velasco, O.F.M. (20 Dec 1751 – 20 Dec 1760 Died)
- Diego Rodríguez de Rivas y Velasco (29 Mar 1762 – 11 Dec 1770 Died)
- Antonio Alcalde y Barriga, O.P. (27 Jan 1772 – 7 Aug 1792 Died)
- Esteban Lorenzo de Tristán y Esmenota (17 Jun 1793 – 10 Dec 1794 Died)
- Juan Cruz Ruiz de Cabañas y Crespo (18 Dec 1795 – 28 Nov 1824 Died)
- José Miguel Gordoa y Barrios (19 Oct 1830 – 12 Jul 1832 Died)
- Diego de Aranda y Carpinteiro (11 Jul 1836 – 17 Mar 1853 Died)

Archdiocese of Guadalajara

Elevated: 26 January 1863

- Pedro Espinosa y Dávalos (12 Sep 1853 – 12 Nov 1866)
- Pedro José de Jesús Loza y Pardavé (22 Jun 1868 – 15 Nov 1898)
- Jacinto López y Romo (19 Aug 1899 – 31 Dec 1900)
- José de Jesús Ortíz y Rodríguez (16 Sep 1901 – 19 Jun 1912 )
- José Francisco Orozco y Jiménez (2 Dec 1912 – 18 Feb 1936)
- José Garibi y Rivera (18 Feb 1936 – 1 Mar 1969); elevated to Cardinal in 1958
- José Salazar López (21 Feb 1970 – 15 May 1987); elevated to Cardinal in 1973
- Juan Jesús Posadas Ocampo (15 May 1987 – 24 May 1993); elevated to Cardinal in 1991
- Juan Sandoval Íñiguez (21 Apr 1994 – 7 Dec 2011); elevated to Cardinal in 1994
- Francisco Robles Ortega (7 Dec 2011 – ); elevated to Cardinal in 2007

=== Coadjutor bishops ===
- José Garibi y Rivera (1934–1936); future Cardinal
- Francisco Javier Nuño y Guerrero (1954–1972); did not succeed to see; appointed Archbishop (personal title) of San Juan de los Lagos, Jalisco

=== Auxiliary bishops ===
- Ignacio Mateo Guerra y Alba (1862–1863), appointed Bishop of Zacatecas
- Francisco Uranga y Sáenz (1919–1922), appointed Bishop of Cuernavaca, Morelos
- Rafael Garcia González (1972–1974), appointed Bishop of Tabasco
- Antonio Sahagún López (1973–1992)
- Adolfo Hernández Hurtado (1974–1997)
- Ramón Godinez Flores (1980–1998), appointed Bishop of Aguascalientes
- José Guadalupe Martín Rábago (1992–1995)
- Javier Navarro Rodríguez (1992–1999), appointed Bishop of San Juan de los Lagos, Jalisco
- José Luis Chávez Botello (1997–2001), appointed Bishop of Tuxtla Gutiérrez, Chiapas
- José Trinidad González Rodríguez (1997–2015)
- Benjamín Castillo Plascencia (1999–2003), appointed Bishop of Tabasco
- Miguel Romano Gómez (2000–2014)
- José María de la Torre Martín (2002–2008), appointed Bishop of Aguascalientes
- Rafael Francisco Martínez Sáinz (2002–2012) (Note: On Thursday, July 19, 2012, Pope Benedict XVI accepted the resignation of Francisco Martínez Sáinz, Auxiliary Bishop of the Roman Catholic Archdiocese of Guadalajara and Titular Bishop of Dura, in accordance with Canons 411 and 401.1 of the Code of Canon Law.)
- José Leopoldo González González (2005–2015), appointed Bishop of Nogales, Sonora
- José Francisco González González (2008–2013), appointed Bishop of Campeche
- Juan Humberto Gutiérrez Valencia (2008–2018)
- Héctor López Alvarado (2018–
- Juan Manuel Muñoz Curiel, O.F.M. (2018–
- Engelberto Polino Sánchez (2018–

=== Other priests of this diocese who became bishops ===
- Rafael Sabás Camacho y García, appointed Bishop of Querétaro in 1885
- Jaime Anesagasti y Llamas, appointed Bishop of Campeche in 1909
- Miguel María de la Mora y Mora, appointed Bishop of Zacatecas in 1911
- Manuel Azpeitia Palomar, appointed Bishop of Tepic, Nayarit in 1919
- Silviano Carrillo y Cárdenas, appointed Bishop of Sinaloa in 1920
- José de Jesús López y González, appointed Auxiliary Bishop of Aguascalientes in 1927
- Ignacio de Alba y Hernández, appointed Coadjutor Bishop of Colima in 1939
- Alfonso Tóriz Cobián, appointed Coadjutor Bishop of Chilapa, Guerrero in 1954
- Miguel González Ibarra, appointed Bishop of Autlán, Jalisco in 1961
- Carlos Quintero Arce, appointed Bishop of Ciudad Valles, San Luís Potosí in 1961
- José Guadalupe Padilla Lozano, appointed Bishop of Veracruz in 1963
- José Trinidad Sepúlveda Ruiz-Velasco, appointed Bishop of Tuxtla Gutiérrez, Chiapas in 1965
- José Refugio Mercado Díaz, appointed Auxiliary Bishop of Tehuantepec, Oaxaca in 2003
- Marcelino Hernández Rodríguez, appointed Auxiliary Bishop of México, Federal District in 2008
- Felipe Salazar Villagrana, appointed Bishop of San Juan de los Lagos, Jalisco in 2008

== See also ==
- List of Roman Catholic archdioceses in México
- Santuario de los Mártires de Cristo Rey
