= Juan Sandoval Íñiguez =

Cardinal of the Roman Catholic Church

His Eminence Juan Sandoval Íñiguez
- Cardinal, Archbishop Emeritus of Guadalajara
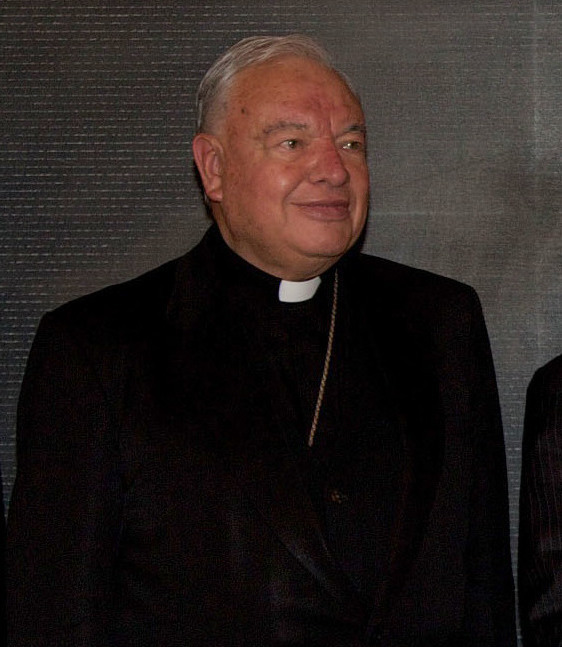
- Archdiocese: Guadalajara
- See: Guadalajara
- Appointed: 21 April 1994
- Term ended: 7 December 2011
- Predecessor: Juan Jesús Posadas Ocampo
- Successor: José Francisco Robles Ortega
- Other post: Cardinal-Priest of Nostra Signora di Guadalupe e San Filippo Martire
- Previous posts: Roman Catholic Diocese of Ciudad Juárez (1988–1992); Bishop of Ciudad Juárez (1992–1994)

Orders
- Ordination: 27 October 1957 by Antonio Samorè
- Consecration: 30 April 1988 by Manuel Talamás Camandari
- Created cardinal: 26 November 1994 by Pope John Paul II
- Rank: Cardinal-Priest

Personal details
- Born: 28 March 1933 (age 93) Yahualica, Mexico
- Denomination: Roman Catholic
- Motto: servus
- Coat of arms

Styles of Juan Sandoval Íñiguez
- Reference style: His Eminence
- Spoken style: Your Eminence
- Informal style: Cardinal
- See: Guadalajara

Juan Sandoval Íñiguez (Spanish pronunciation: [xwan sandoˈβal ˈiɲiɣes]; born 28 March 1933) is a Mexican retired prelate of the Catholic Church who served as the Archbishop of Guadalajara from 1994 to 2011. He was made a cardinal by Pope John Paul II in 1994.

== Ecclesiastical career ==
He is a son of Esteban Sandoval Ruiz and María Guadalupe Íñiguez de Sandoval, and is the eldest of 12 brothers and sisters, of whom 2 died as infants and another was killed.

Sandoval entered the seminary in 1945 and then went to Rome where he continued his studies. He was ordained a priest in Rome in 1957.

In 1961, he returned to Mexico and was assigned to the seminary in Guadalajara, Jalisco, where he worked first as a teacher and then as rector.

In 1988 Sandoval was named coadjutor bishop of Ciudad Juárez, Chihuahua, and succeeded as its bishop in 1992. He was invested as Archbishop of Guadalajara in April 1994, replacing the murdered former incumbent, Cardinal Juan Jesús Posadas Ocampo, and later that year he was named a cardinal.

He was one of the cardinal electors who participated in the 2005 papal conclave that elected Pope Benedict XVI. Cardinal Sandoval has also made regular appearances on the Mexican Catholic network "Mariavisión", which is based in Guadalajara, normally by teaching the catechism during short episodes between regular programming.

On 7 December 2011 his retirement was accepted by Pope Benedict XVI; Cardinal Francisco Robles Ortega was appointed his successor.

He was one of the cardinal electors who participated in the 2013 papal conclave that elected Pope Francis.

In August 2023, Cardinal Sandoval, along with cardinals Raymond Leo Burke, Walter Brandmüller, Robert Sarah, and Joseph Zen, submitted a list of five dubia to Pope Francis related to the upcoming Synod on Synodality. The Dubia questioned the necessity of the upcoming synod, asked whether the blessing of same-sex unions was theologically admissible, and questioned the Pope's claim that "forgiveness is a human right". Sandoval has also been a strong supporter of the Tridentine Mass, and in 2024, called on Pope Francis not to further restrict its use.

== Political controversy ==
Sandoval has frequently intervened in political issues at the national level.

He has organized opposition to the use of condoms, sex education, emergency contraceptive pills. In August 2010 he entered the debate on the legalisation of gay marriage in Mexico by accusing justices of the Mexican Supreme Court of having accepted bribes from the Party of the Democratic Revolution (PRD) and the PRD mayor of Mexico City, Marcelo Ebrard, to uphold the Mexico City statute that legalises both gay marriage and gay adoption of children. Ebrard filed suit against him in the civil courts in Mexico City for defamation after Sandoval refused to retract his comments.

He has made several controversial statements. He has said, "To be a Protestant, one cannot have any shame"; and on women rape victims he has been quoted as saying: "Women should not go around being so provocative; because of this there are so many rapes." He has been criticised by gay rights groups for using the term "maricón" (Spanish equivalent to "fag") to describe homosexuals, which is regarded as insulting.

In 2015, following the legalization of same-sex marriage in Mexico, Sandoval, along with Archbishop Carlos Cabrero and the Spanish exorcist José Antonio Fortea, performed a mass exorcism against "abortion, Satanism, corruption, the cult of 'holy' death and the legalization of sexual aberrations."

Facebook placed a warning screen over a chat by Sandoval Iñiguez on 12 January, 2021, in which he claimed COVID-19 vaccines contain a satanic microchip.

Cardinal Sandoval was admitted to hospital on 3 February 2021 after suffering heart failure, but according to the archdiocese, he has since recovered.

== External links and additional sources ==
- Cheney, David M. "Archdiocese of Guadalajara". Catholic-Hierarchy.org. (for Chronology of Bishops)^{self-published}
- Chow, Gabriel. "Metropolitan Archdiocese of Guadalajara". GCatholic.org. (for Chronology of Bishops)^{self-published}
- "Sandoval Íñiguez Card. Juan". Holy See Press Office. Archived from the original on 4 September 2017.
- Archdiocese of Guadalajara

Catholic Church titles
Preceded by Manuel Talamás Camandari	Bishop of Ciudad Juárez; 11 July 1992 – 21 April 1994	Succeeded by Renato Ascencio León
Preceded by Juan Jesús Posadas Ocampo	Archbishop of Guadalajara; 21 April 1994 – 7 December 2011	Succeeded by José Francisco Robles Ortega
Preceded by Juan Jesús Posadas Ocampo	Cardinal Priest of Nostra Signora di Guadalupe e San Filippo Martire; 26 November 1994 –	Incumbent
