= Juan de Sancto Mathía Sáenz de Mañozca y Murillo =

Mexican Roman Catholic prelate

Most Reverend Juan de Sancto Mathía Sáenz de Mañozca y Murillo
- Bishop of Santiago de Guatemala
- Church: Catholic Church
- Diocese: Diocese of Santiago de Guatemala
- In office: 1668–1675
- Predecessor: Payo Afán Enríquez de Ribera Manrique de Lara
- Successor: Juan de Ortega Cano Montañez y Patiño
- Previous post: Bishop of Santiago de Cuba (1661–1668)

Orders
- Consecration: 24 August 1662 by Diego Osorio de Escobar y Llamas

Personal details
- Born: 24 January 1611 Mexico (Viceroyalty of New Spain)
- Died: 13 February 1675 (aged 64) Guatemala (Captaincy General of Guatemala)

Juan de Sancto Mathía Sáenz de Mañozca y Murillo (24 January 1611 – 13 February 1675) was a Roman Catholic prelate who served as Bishop of Santiago de Guatemala (1668–1675) and Bishop of Santiago de Cuba (1661–1668). He was also selected and confirmed as Bishop of Tlaxcala in 1675 after his death.

== Biography ==
Juan de Sancto Mathía Sáenz de Mañozca y Murillo was born in Mexico on 24 January 1611. On 5 September 1661, he was appointed during the papacy of Pope Alexander VII as Bishop of Santiago de Cuba. On 24 August 1662, he was consecrated bishop by Diego Osorio de Escobar y Llamas, Bishop of Tlaxcala. On 27 February 1668, he was appointed during the papacy of Pope Clement IX as Bishop of Santiago de Guatemala and installed on 13 June 1668. He served as Bishop of Santiago de Guatemala until his death on 13 February 1675. As notification of his death had not yet reached Rome and Spain, on 14 April 1675, he was selected by the King of Spain as Bishop of Tlaxcala and on 17 June 1675, he was confirmed by Pope Clement X.

While bishop, he was the principal consecrator of Alfonso Bravo de Laguna, Bishop of Nicaragua (1671).

== External links and additional sources ==
- Cheney, David M. "Archdiocese of Santiago de Cuba". Catholic-Hierarchy.org. (for Chronology of Bishops) ^{[self-published]}
- Chow, Gabriel. "Metropolitan Archdiocese of Santiago". GCatholic.org. (for Chronology of Bishops) ^{[self-published]}
- Cheney, David M. "Archdiocese of Puebla de los Ángeles, Puebla". Catholic-Hierarchy.org. (for Chronology of Bishops) ^{[self-published]}
- Chow, Gabriel. "Metropolitan Archdiocese of Puebla de los Ángeles (Mexico)". GCatholic.org. (for Chronology of Bishops) ^{[self-published]}
- Cheney, David M. "Archdiocese of Guatemala". Catholic-Hierarchy.org. (for Chronology of Bishops) ^{[self-published]}
- Chow, Gabriel. "Metropolitan Archdiocese of Santiago de Guatemala". GCatholic.org. (for Chronology of Bishops) ^{[self-published]}

Catholic Church titles
Preceded by Pedro de Reina Maldonado	Bishop of Santiago de Cuba; 1661–1668	Succeeded by Alfonso Bernardo de los Ríos y Guzmán
Preceded by Payo Afán Enríquez de Ribera Manrique de Lara	Bishop of Santiago de Guatemala; 1668–1675	Succeeded by Juan de Ortega Cano Montañez y Patiño
Preceded by Diego Osorio de Escobar y Llamas	Bishop of Tlaxcala; Appointed 1675 (died prior to appointment)	Succeeded by Manuel Fernández de Santa Cruz
