= Alfonso Bravo de Laguna =

Roman Catholic bishop (1616–1674)

Most Reverend Alfonso Bravo de Laguna
- Bishop of Nicaragua
- Church: Catholic Church
- Diocese: Diocese of Nicaragua
- In office: 1664–1674
- Predecessor: Juan de la Torre y Castro
- Successor: Andrés de las Navas y Quevedo

Orders
- Consecration: 21 September 1671 by Juan de Sancto Mathía Sáenz de Mañozca y Murillo

Personal details
- Born: 1616 Tepeaca, Mexico
- Died: June 9, 1674 (aged 57–58) Cartago, Costa Rica

Alfonso Bravo de Laguna, O.F.M. (1616 – 9 June 1674) was a Roman Catholic prelate who served as Bishop of Nicaragua (1664–1674).

== Biography ==
Alfonso Bravo de Laguna was born in Tepeaca, Mexico in 1616 and ordained a priest in the Order of Friars Minor. After the death of Tomás Manso in 1659, he was appointed in 1660 as Vicar Capitular of the Diocese of León in Nicaragua. As Manso's replacement, Bishop Juan de la Torre y Castro, died six days after arriving in Nicaragua, he continued as administrator of the diocese. In July 1664, he was selected by the King of Spain as Bishop of Nicaragua but not confirmed by Pope Clement X until six years later on 1 September 1670. On 21 September 1671, he was consecrated bishop by Juan de Sancto Mathía Sáenz de Mañozca y Murillo, Bishop of Santiago de Guatemala. He served as Bishop of Nicaragua until his death on 9 June 1674 in Cartago, Costa Rica.

== External links and additional sources ==
- Cheney, David M. "Diocese of León en Nicaragua". Catholic-Hierarchy.org. (for Chronology of Bishops) ^{[self-published]}
- Chow, Gabriel. "Diocese of León (Nicaragua)". GCatholic.org. (for Chronology of Bishops) ^{[self-published]}

Catholic Church titles
Preceded by Juan de la Torre y Castro	Bishop of Nicaragua; 1664–1674	Succeeded by Andrés de las Navas y Quevedo
