= Diego Osorio de Escobar y Llamas =

Bishop of Puebla and Viceroy of New Spain

- Bishop of Puebla de los Ángeles
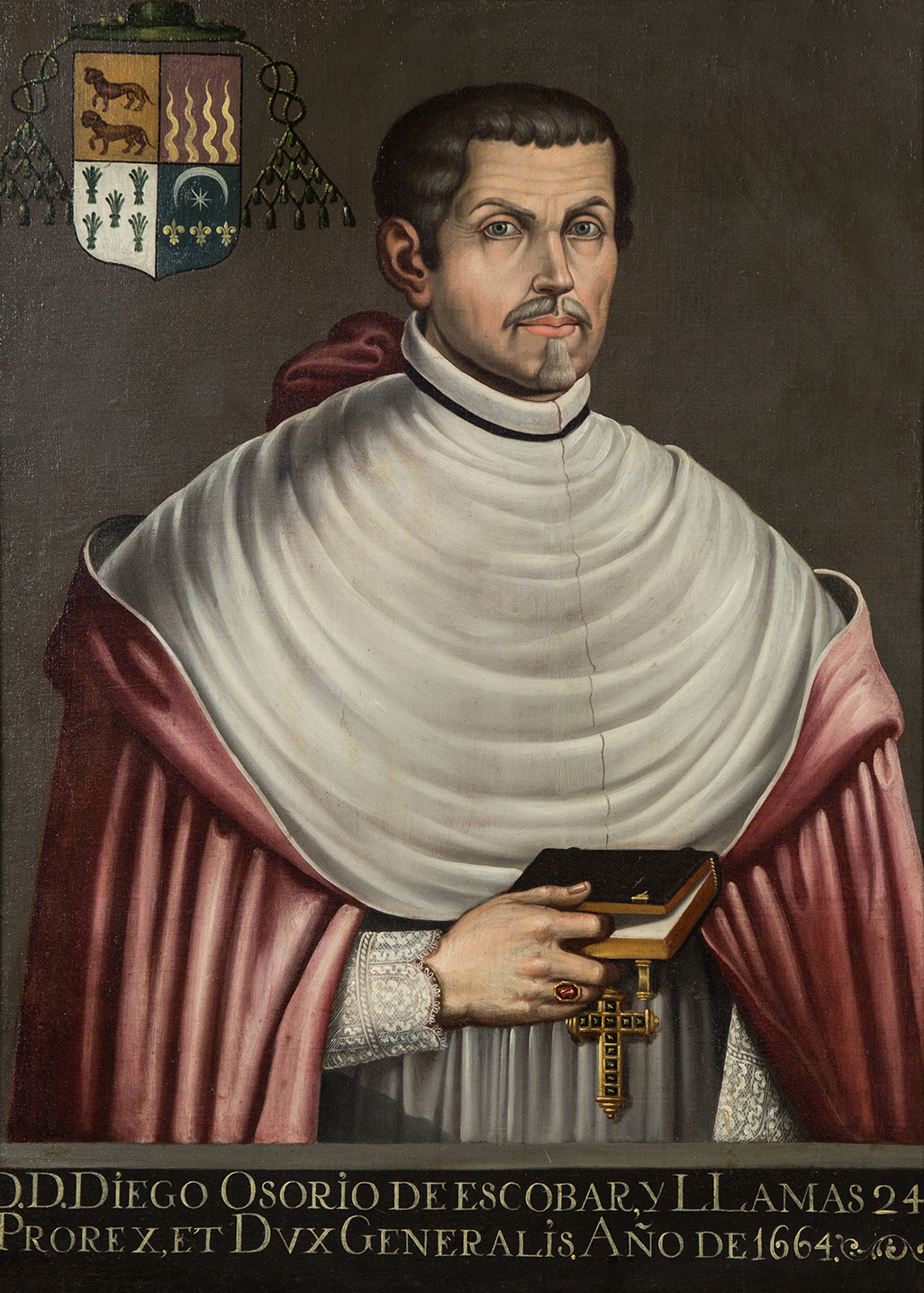
- Church: Catholic Church
- Diocese: Puebla
- In office: 25 July 1656 – 17 October 1673
- Predecessor: Juan de Palafox y Mendoza
- Successor: Juan de Sancto Mathía Sáenz de Mañozca y Murillo

Orders
- Consecration: 25 July 1656 by Pope Alexander VII

Personal details
- Born: c. 1608 A Coruña, Galicia, Spain
- Died: 17 October 1673 (aged 64–65) Puebla, New Spain
- Buried: Mexico City Metropolitan Cathedral
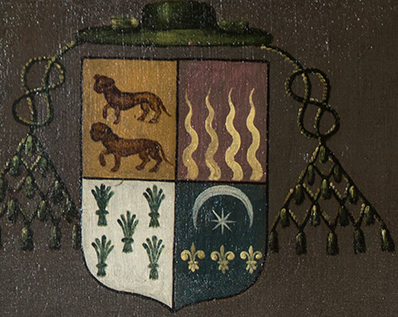
- Coat of arms: Diego Osorio de Escobar y Llamas's coat of arms

Ordination history
Episcopal succession
Bishops consecrated by Diego Osorio de Escobar y Llamas as principal consecrator
- Luís de Cifuentes y Sotomayor, O.P.: 1660
- Juan Sáenz de Mañozca y Murillo: 1662
- Juan de la Torre y Castro, O.F.M.: 1662

24th Viceroy of New Spain
- In office 29 June 1664 – 15 October 1664
- Monarch: Philip IV
- Preceded by: Juan Francisco Leiva y de la Cerda
- Succeeded by: Antonio Sebastián Álvarez de Toledo y Salazar

Diego Osorio de Escobar y Llamas (c. 1608 – 17 October 1673) was Roman Catholic bishop of Puebla (1656–1673) and viceroy of New Spain from 29 June 1664 to 15 October 1664.

== Ecclesiastical career ==
Osorio de Escobar y Llamas held the offices of canon, inquisitor and vicar-general in the diocese of Toledo. He was a member of the secular clergy, but a friend of the Jesuits. On 2 August 1655, he was chosen during the papacy of Pope Alexander VII as bishop of Puebla, on the recommendation of Cardinal Moscoso. On 25 July 1656, he was consecrated bishop.

He took up the position in 1656 and remained there until his death in 1673. There he built the convent of La Santísima Trinidad, hastened the construction of the cathedral, and paid for the chapel and altar of Nuestra Señora de Guadalupe. In 1663 he was named archbishop of Mexico City, but he declined the office in order to remain in Puebla (although he did administer the diocese for a few months until the arrival of the new archbishop, Alonso de Cuevas Dávalos). While bishop, he was the principal consecrator of: Luís de Cifuentes y Sotomayor, Bishop of Yucatán (1660); Juan de Sancto Mathía Sáenz de Mañozca y Murillo, Bishop of Santiago de Cuba (1662); and Juan de la Torre y Castro, Bishop of Nicaragua (1662).

== Service as viceroy ==
He was viceroy for less than four months, from June to October 1664. He was named to the position to replace Viceroy Juan Francisco Leiva y de la Cerda, who was ordered back to Spain because of corruption. Osorio apparently accepted the position with reluctance. He was a stranger to profane affairs, and resigned as viceroy at the first opportunity in order to return to his diocese in Puebla.

During his brief administration, he sent 30,000 pesos to Cuba for the repair of the Castle of Santiago and the rebuilding of the city, which had been destroyed by the English in 1662. He also founded a gunpowder factory and sent some of the production to Cuba. He took steps to see that the Armada de Barlovento was prepared for an attack on the Gulf coast of New Spain. He advanced money for the fortification of Campeche. Spain was still at war with England.

He reformed the postal service, which was very bad before his administration and much more efficient after his reforms. He also reformed the marketing of mercury and intervened in a dispute between the Franciscans and the governor of Yucatán.

== Return to Puebla ==
After resigning as viceroy in 1664, Bishop Osorio de Escobar had difficulties with his successor, Antonio Sebastián de Toledo. The bishop went into seclusion in the town of Tlatlauquitepec until 1666, when he was able to return to his diocese in Puebla. He died there in 1673 and his body was interred in the Mexico City Metropolitan Cathedral. Later it was moved to La Santísima Trinidad, the convent he had founded.

== Writings ==
- "Alegación Jurídica por los Derechos Decimales de las Santas Iglesias del Noreste"
- "Alegación Canónica por la Dignidad Episcopal Angelopolitana"
- "Jurisdicción Apostólica Delegada y Ordinaria sobre Erección de Monasterios Religiosos"

== External links and additional sources ==
- Cheney, David M. "Archdiocese of Puebla de los Ángeles, Puebla". Catholic-Hierarchy.org. (for Chronology of Bishops) ^{[self-published]}
- Chow, Gabriel. "Metropolitan Archdiocese of Puebla de los Ángeles (Mexico)". GCatholic.org. (for Chronology of Bishops) ^{[self-published]}

Catholic Church titles
| Preceded by Juan de Palafox y Mendoza | Bishop of Puebla; 1656 – 1673 | Succeeded by Juan de Sancto Mathía; Sáenz de Mañozca y Murillo |
Political offices
| Preceded by Juan Francisco Leiva y de la Cerda | Viceroy of New Spain; 1664 | Succeeded by Antonio Sebastián Álvarez de Toledo y Salazar |
