= Juan Guzmán (Spanish bishop) =

Spanish Catholic prelate (1572–1634)

Most Reverend Juan Guzmán
- Archbishop of Zaragoza
- Church: Catholic Church
- Archdiocese: Archdiocese of Zaragoza
- In office: 1633–1634
- Predecessor: Martín Terrer Valenzuela
- Successor: Pedro Apaolaza Ramírez
- Previous posts: Bishop of Islas Canarias (1622–1627); Archbishop of Tarragona (1627–1633)

Orders
- Consecration: 6 November 1622

Personal details
- Born: 1572
- Died: 1 March 1634 (age 62) Zaragoza, Spain

Juan Guzmán, O.F.M. (1572 – 1 March 1634) was a Catholic prelate who served as Archbishop of Zaragoza (1633–1634), Archbishop of Tarragona (1627–1633), and Bishop of Islas Canarias (1622–1627).

== Biography ==
Juan Guzmán was born in 1572 and ordained a priest in the Order of Friars Minor. On 11 July 1622, he was appointed during the papacy of Pope Gregory XV as Bishop of Islas Canarias. On 6 November 1622, he was consecrated bishop. On 6 October 1627, he was appointed during the papacy of Pope Urban VIII as Archbishop of Tarragona. On 6 June 1633, he was appointed during the papacy of Pope Urban VIII as Archbishop of Zaragoza. He served as Archbishop of Zaragoza until his death on 1 March 1634.

== Episcopal succession ==
While bishop, he was the principal consecrator of:

- Agustin de Hinojosa y Montalvo, Bishop of Nicaragua (1630);
- Marcos Ramírez de Prado y Ovando, Bishop of Chiapas (1633);
- Juan Cebrián Pedro, Bishop of Albarracin (1633); and
- Gonzalo Chacón Velasco y Fajardo, Bishop of Calahorra y La Calzada (1633).

== External links and additional sources ==
- Cheney, David M. "Diocese of Islas Canarias". Catholic-Hierarchy.org. (for Chronology of Bishops)^{self-published}
- Chow, Gabriel. "Diocese of Islas Canarias {Canary Islands} (Spain)". GCatholic.org. (for Chronology of Bishops)^{self-published}
- Cheney, David M. "Archdiocese of Tarragona". Catholic-Hierarchy.org. (for Chronology of Bishops)^{self-published}
- Chow, Gabriel. "Metropolitan Archdiocese of Tarragona (Spain)". GCatholic.org. (for Chronology of Bishops)^{self-published}
- Cheney, David M. "Archdiocese of Zaragoza". Catholic-Hierarchy.org. (for Chronology of Bishops)^{self-published}
- Chow, Gabriel. "Metropolitan Archdiocese of Zaragoza (Spain)". GCatholic.org. (for Chronology of Bishops)^{self-published}

Catholic Church titles
Preceded by Pedro Herrera Suárez	Bishop of Islas Canarias; 1622–1627	Succeeded by Cristóbal de la Cámara y Murga
Preceded by Juan Hoces	Archbishop of Tarragona; 1627–1633	Succeeded by Antonio Pérez (archbishop)
Preceded by Martín Terrer Valenzuela	Archbishop of Zaragoza; 1633–1634	Succeeded by Pedro Apaolaza Ramírez
