= Francisco Marroquín =

Spanish bishop

Most Reverend Francisco Marroquín Hurtado
- Bishop of Santiago de Guatemala
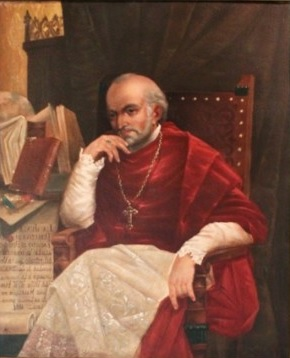
- Francisco Marroquín on a Guatemalan stamp
- Church: Catholic Church
- Diocese: Diocese of Santiago de Guatemala
- In office: 1534–1563
- Predecessor: None
- Successor: Bernardino de Villalpando

Orders
- Consecration: 8 April 1537 by Juan de Zumárraga

Personal details
- Born: 1478 Santander, Crown of Castile
- Died: 19 April 1563 (aged 84–85) Guatemala City, Spanish Guatemala

Francisco Marroquín (1478 – April 18, 1563) was the first bishop of Guatemala, translator of Central American languages and provisional Governor of Guatemala.

== Biography ==
Marroquín was born near Santander in 1478. He studied philosophy and theology in Osuna. After entering the priesthood, Marroquín became a professor at the University of Osuna where he met Bishop García de Loaisa, an adviser to Emperor Charles V. Marroquín became a priest in the Spanish royal court. In 1528 the conquistador Pedro de Alvarado, Governor of Guatemala, was in Spain and met Marroquín; he convinced the priest to accompany him back to Guatemala.

After first arriving in Mexico, he traveled onwards to Guatemala with Alvarado, in May 1528. On April 11, 1530, he was appointed parish priest of Guatemala. On December 18, 1534, he was appointed during the papacy of Pope Paul III as Bishop of Santiago de Guatemala and later provisional governor of Guatemala. On April 8, 1537, he was consecrated bishop by Juan de Zumárraga, Archbishop of Mexico, with Juan Lopez de Zárate, Bishop of Antequera, Oaxaca serving as co-consecrator. While bishop, he was the principal consecrator of Tomás Casillas, Bishop of Chiapas (1552) and principal co-consecrator of Antonio de Valdivieso, Bishop of Nicaragua (1544).

Marroquín founded the School of Saint Thomas in 1559 (now the University of San Carlos of Guatemala) as part of his efforts to educate the native people. He became a scholar of the Kʼicheʼ language and published the first catechism in that language.

The Universidad Francisco Marroquín in Guatemala City is named for him.

== External links and additional sources ==
- Cheney, David M. "Archdiocese of Guatemala". Catholic-Hierarchy.org. (for Chronology of Bishops) ^{[self-published]}
- Chow, Gabriel. "Metropolitan Archdiocese of Santiago de Guatemala". GCatholic.org. (for Chronology of Bishops) ^{[self-published]}
- Recinos, Adrian (1986) [1952]. Pedro de Alvarado: Conquistador de México y Guatemala (in Spanish) (2nd ed.). Guatemala: CENALTEX Centro Nacional de Libros de Texto y Material Didáctico "José de Pineda Ibarra". OCLC 243309954.

Catholic Church titles
Preceded by None	Bishop of Santiago de Guatemala; 1534-1563	Succeeded by Bernardino de Villalpando
