= Matthieu de Castro Malo =

Most Reverend Matthieu de Castro Malo
- Titular Bishop of Chrysopolis in Arabia
- Church: Catholic Church
- In office: 1637–1677
- Predecessor: None
- Successor: Custodio do Pinho
- Previous post: Vicar Apostolic of Idalcan (1637–1669)

Orders
- Consecration: 30 November 1637 by Andrea Soffiani

Personal details
- Born: 1604
- Died: 20 July 1677 (age 73)

Matthieu de Castro Malo, C.O. or Matheus de Castro Mahalo (1604–1677) was a Roman Catholic prelate who served as Titular Bishop of Chrysopolis in Arabia (1637–1677) and Vicar Apostolic of Idalcan (1637–1669).

== Biography ==
Matthieu de Castro Malo was born in 1604 and ordained a priest in the Oratory of Saint Philip Neri. On 14 November 1637, he was appointed during the papacy of Pope Urban VIII as Vicar Apostolic of Idalcan and Titular Bishop of Chrysopolis in Arabia. On 30 November 1637, he was consecrated bishop by Andrea Soffiani, Bishop of Santorini, with Domenico Marengo, Bishop of Syros e Milos, and Giacomo Della Rocca, Bishop of Termia, serving as co-consecrators. He served as Vicar Apostolic of Idalca until his resignation in 1669. He died on 20 July 1677.

== External links and additional sources ==
- Cheney, David M. "Archdiocese of Bombay". Catholic-Hierarchy.org. (for Chronology of Bishops) ^{[self-published]}
- Chow, Gabriel. "Metropolitan Archdiocese of Bombay (India)". GCatholic.org. (for Chronology of Bishops) ^{[self-published]}

Catholic Church titles
Preceded by None	Vicar Apostolic of Idalcan; 1637–1669	Succeeded by Custodio do Pinho
Preceded by Jean Bernard d'Angeloch	Titular Bishop of Chrysopolis in Arabia; 1637–1677	Succeeded by Thomas Henrici
