= Agustin de Hinojosa y Montalvo =

Spanish Catholic bishop (1575–1631)

Most Reverend Agustin de Hinojosa y Montalvo
- Bishop of Nicaragua
- Church: Catholic Church
- Diocese: Diocese of Nicaragua
- In office: 1630–1631
- Predecessor: Benito Rodríguez Valtodano
- Successor: Juan Barahona Zapata del Águila

Orders
- Consecration: 16 September 1630 by Juan Guzman

Personal details
- Born: 1575 Madrid, Spain
- Died: 5 July 1631 (age 56) León, Nicaragua

Agustin de Hinojosa y Montalvo, O.F.M. (1575 – 5 July 1631) was a Roman Catholic prelate who served as Bishop of Nicaragua (1630–1631).

== Biography ==
Agustin de Hinojosa y Montalvo was born in Madrid, Spain in 1575 and ordained a priest in the Order of Friars Minor. On 12 August 1630, he was appointed during the papacy of Pope Urban VIII as Bishop of Nicaragua. On 16 September 1630, he was consecrated bishop by Juan Guzman, Archbishop of Tarragona with Francisco Olivares Maldonado, Auxiliary Bishop of Toledo, and Cristóforo Chrisostome Carletti, Bishop of Termia, serving as co-consecrators. He served as Bishop of Nicaragua until his death on 5 July 1631.

== External links and additional sources ==
- Cheney, David M. "Diocese of León en Nicaragua". Catholic-Hierarchy.org. (for Chronology of Bishops) ^{[self-published]}
- Chow, Gabriel. "Diocese of León (Nicaragua)". GCatholic.org. (for Chronology of Bishops) ^{[self-published]}

Catholic Church titles
Preceded by Benito Rodríguez Valtodano	Bishop of Nicaragua; 1630–1631	Succeeded by Juan Barahona Zapata del Águila
