= Cristóforo Chrisostome Carletti =

Most Reverend Cristóforo Chrisostome Carletti
- Auxiliary Bishop of Calahorra y La Calzada
- Church: Catholic Church
- Diocese: Diocese of Calahorra y La Calzada
- In office: 1624–1634
- Predecessor: Petrus Pitarca
- Successor: Giacomo Della Rocca
- Previous post: Bishop of Termia (1622-1627)

Orders
- Consecration: 29 May 1622 by Marco Antonio Gozzadini

Personal details
- Born: 1 April 1564 Capranica, Lazio, Italy
- Died: 1634 (aged 69–70)

Cristóforo Chrisostome Carletti (1 April 1564 – 1634) was a Roman Catholic prelate who served as Auxiliary Bishop of Calahorra y La Calzada (1624–1634) and Bishop of Termia (1622–1627).

== Biography ==
Cristóforo Chrisostome Carletti was born on 1 April 1564 in Capranica, Lazio, Italy and ordained a priest in the Order of Friars Minor. On 23 May 1622, he was appointed during the papacy of Pope Gregory XV as Bishop of Termia. On 29 May 1622, he was consecrated bishop by Marco Antonio Gozzadini, Cardinal-Priest of Sant'Eusebio, with Petrus Salinates, Bishop of Sardica, and Benedikt Orsini, Bishop of Lezhë, as co-consecrators. In 1624, he was appointed during the papacy of Pope Urban VIII as Auxiliary Bishop of Calahorra y La Calzada. In 1627, he resigned as Bishop of Termia and in 1634, he resigned as Auxiliary Bishop of Calahorra y La Calzada.

== Episcopal succession ==
While bishop, he was the principal co-consecrator of:

- Agustin de Hinojosa y Montalvo, Bishop of Nicaragua (1630);
- Juan Barahona Zapata del Águila, Bishop of Nicaragua (1632);
- Alfonso de Franco y Luna, Bishop of Durango (1632);
- Martín Carrillo Alderete, Bishop of Oviedo (1633);
- Bartolomé Santos de Risoba, Bishop of Almería (1634); and
- Antonio González Acevedo, Bishop of Almería (1634).

Catholic Church titles
Preceded by Petrus Pitarca	Bishop of Termia; 1622–1627	Succeeded by Giacomo Della Rocca
Preceded by None	Auxiliary Bishop of Calahorra y La Calzada; 1624–1634	Succeeded by None
