= Juan Barahona Zapata del Águila =

Spanish Catholic bishop (1578–1632)

Most Reverend Juan Barahona Zapata del Águila
- Bishop of Nicaragua
- Church: Catholic Church
- Diocese: Diocese of Nicaragua
- In office: 1631–1632
- Predecessor: Agustin de Hinojosa y Montalvo
- Successor: Fernando Núñez Sagredo

Orders
- Consecration: 28 October 1632 by Gregorio Pedrosa Cásares

Personal details
- Born: October 1578 Madrid, Spain
- Died: 19 November 1632 (age 54) León, Nicaragua

Juan Barahona Zapata del Águila (October, 1578 – 19 November, 1632) was a Catholic prelate who served as Bishop of Nicaragua (1631–1632).

== Biography ==
Juan Barahona Zapata del Águila was born in Madrid, Spain in October 1578. On 3 December 1631, he was appointed during the papacy of Pope Urban VIII as Bishop of Nicaragua. On 28 October 1632, he was consecrated bishop by Gregorio Pedrosa Cásares, Bishop of León with Juan Bravo Lagunas, Bishop Emeritus of Ugento, and Cristóforo Chrisostome Carletti, Bishop of Termia, serving as co-consecrators. He served as Bishop of Nicaragua until his death on 19 November 1632. While bishop, he was the principal co-consecrator of Alfonso de Franco y Luna, Bishop of Durango (1632).

== External links and additional sources ==
- Cheney, David M. "Diocese of León en Nicaragua". Catholic-Hierarchy.org. (for Chronology of Bishops) ^{[self-published]}
- Chow, Gabriel. "Diocese of León (Nicaragua)". GCatholic.org. (for Chronology of Bishops) ^{[self-published]}

Catholic Church titles
Preceded by Agustin de Hinojosa y Montalvo	Bishop of Nicaragua; 1631–1632	Succeeded by Fernando Núñez Sagredo
