= François Maronus =

Most Reverend François Maronus
- Church: Catholic Church

Orders
- Consecration: 25 Aug 1535 by Martin de Portugal

François Maronus was a Roman Catholic bishop.

== Biography ==
On 25 Aug 1535, François Maronus was consecrated bishop by Martin de Portugal, Archbishop of Funchal with Giovanni de Rosa, Bishop of Krk, and Dionisio Zannettini, Bishop of Ceos and Thermia, serving as co-consecrators.
