= Francisco Olivares Maldonado =

Spanish Roman Catholic prelate

Most Reverend Francisco Olivares Maldonado
- Auxiliary Bishop of Toledo
- Church: Catholic Church
- Archdiocese: Archdiocese of Toledo
- In office: 1626–1632

Personal details
- Born: 1564 Granada, Spain
- Died: 8 March 1632 (age 68) Toledo, Spain

Francisco Olivares Maldonado (1564 – 8 March, 1632) was a Roman Catholic prelate who served as Auxiliary Bishop of Toledo (1626–1632).

== Biography ==
Francisco Olivares Maldonado was born in Granada, Spain in 1564 and ordained a priest in the Order of Saint Augustine. On 7 September 1626, he was appointed during the papacy of Pope Urban VIII as Auxiliary Bishop of Toledo and Titular Bishop of Siriensis. He served as Auxiliary Bishop of Toledo until his death on 8 March 1632. While bishop, he was the principal co-consecrator of Agustin de Hinojosa y Montalvo, Bishop of Nicaragua (1630); Pedro Moya Arjona, Bishop of Tui (1631); and Facundo de la Torre, Archbishop of Santo Domingo (1632).
