= Juan del Castillo =

Juan del Castillo may also refer to:

- Juan del Castillo (painter) (1590–1657), Spanish Baroque painter.
- Juan del Castillo (bishop) (?–1593), Spanish Roman Catholic bishop
- Juan de Castillo (Jesuit) (1595–1628), Spanish Jesuit saint killed in Paraguay
- Juan del Castillo (footballer) (1889–1977), Spanish footballer and president of Real Betis
