= Luís de la Fuente (bishop) =

Roman Catholic prelate

Most Reverend Luís de la Fuente
- Bishop of Nicaragua
- Church: Catholic Church
- Diocese: Diocese of Nicaragua
- In office: 1564–1566
- Predecessor: Lázaro Carrasco
- Successor: Pedro Gómez de Córdoba

Personal details
- Died: December 1566 León, Nicaragua

Luís de la Fuente or Luís de la Fuentes was a Roman Catholic prelate who served as Bishop of Nicaragua (1564–1566).

== Biography ==
On 28 Apr 1564, Luís de la Fuente was appointed during the papacy of Pope Pius IV as Bishop of Nicaragua. While bishop, he presided over the merger of Costa Rica and Nicaragua into a single ecclesiastical jurisdiction. On 6 Jul 1565, he was consecrated bishop. He served as Bishop of Nicaragua until his death in Dec 1566.

== External links and additional sources ==
- Cheney, David M. "Diocese of León en Nicaragua". Catholic-Hierarchy.org. (for Chronology of Bishops) ^{[self-published]}
- Chow, Gabriel. "Diocese of León (Nicaragua)". GCatholic.org. (for Chronology of Bishops) ^{[self-published]}

Catholic Church titles
Preceded by Lázaro Carrasco	Bishop of Nicaragua; 1564–1566	Succeeded by Pedro Gómez de Córdoba
