= Antonio de Zayas (bishop) =

Most Reverend Antonio de Zayas
- Bishop of Nicaragua
- Church: Catholic Church
- Diocese: Diocese of Nicaragua
- In office: 1575–1582
- Predecessor: Pedro Gómez de Córdoba
- Successor: Domingo de Ulloa

Personal details
- Died: 16 October 1582 León, Nicaragua

Antonio de Zayas (died 16 October 1582) was a Roman Catholic prelate who served as Bishop of Nicaragua (1575–1582).

== Biography ==
De Zayas was from Ecija, Spain, and ordained a priest in the Order of Friars Minor. On 19 January 1575, he was appointed during the papacy of Pope Gregory XIII as Bishop of Nicaragua and arrived in Nicaragua in January 1576. Suffering from ill health, he resigned as Bishop of Nicaragua on 8 March 1582 and died on 16 October 1582.

== External links and additional sources ==
- Cheney, David M. "Diocese of León en Nicaragua". Catholic-Hierarchy.org. (for Chronology of Bishops) ^{[self-published]}
- Chow, Gabriel. "Diocese of León (Nicaragua)". GCatholic.org. (for Chronology of Bishops) ^{[self-published]}

Catholic Church titles
Preceded by Pedro Gómez de Córdoba	Bishop of Nicaragua; 1575–1582	Succeeded by Domingo de Ulloa
