= Antonio de Valdivieso =

Bishop of Nicaragua (died 1549)

Servant of God Antonio de Valdivieso OP
- Bishop of Nicaragua
- Painting of Antonio de Valdivieso
- Church: Catholic Church
- Diocese: Diocese of Nicaragua
- In office: 1544–1549
- Predecessor: Francisco de Mendavia
- Successor: Fernando González de Bariodero

Orders
- Consecration: 8 Nov 1544 by Bartolomé de las Casas

Personal details
- Born: 1495 Burgos, Spain
- Died: 26 February 1549 (aged 53–54) León, Nicaragua

Antonio de Valdivieso (born 1495 died 26 Feb 1549) was a Roman Catholic prelate who served as Bishop of Nicaragua (1544–1549).

== Biography ==
Antonio de Valdivieso was ordained a priest in the Order of Preachers. On 29 Feb 1544, he was appointed during the papacy of Pope Paul III as Bishop of Nicaragua. On 8 Nov 1544, he was consecrated bishop by Bartolomé de las Casas, with Francisco Marroquín Hurtado, Bishop of Santiago de Guatemala, and Cristóbal de Pedraza, Bishop of Comayagua, serving as co-consecrators. As he was very concerned for the wellbeing of the Indians and the abuses practiced under the encomienda system, he attracted the ire of the governor, who libeled his character in Granada. Hernando de Contreras, the son of the governor, roused an angry mob, went to Valdivieso's home, and subsequently stabbed the Valdivieso to death on 26 Feb 1549.

== External links and additional sources ==
- Cheney, David M. "Diocese of León en Nicaragua". Catholic-Hierarchy.org. (for Chronology of Bishops) ^{[self-published]}
- Chow, Gabriel. "Diocese of León (Nicaragua)". GCatholic.org. (for Chronology of Bishops) ^{[self-published]}

Catholic Church titles
| Preceded by Francisco de Mendavia | Bishop of Nicaragua; 1544–1549 | Succeeded by Fernando González de Bariodero |
