= Giacomo Della Rocca =

Most Reverend Giacomo Della Rocca
- Bishop of Termia
- Church: Catholic Church
- Diocese: Diocese of Termia
- In office: 1634–1644
- Predecessor: Cristóforo Chrisostome Carletti
- Successor: Giovanni Camponeschi

Personal details
- Born: 1569
- Died: 1644 (aged 74–75) Kythnos, Greece

Giacomo Della Rocca (1569 – 1644) was a Roman Catholic prelate who served as Bishop of Termia (1634–1644).

== Biography ==
Giacomo Della Rocca was born in 1569. On 25 September 1634, he was appointed during the papacy of Pope Urban VIII as Bishop of Termia. He served as Bishop of Termia until his death in 1644. While bishop, he was the principal co-consecrator of Francesco Antonio Frasella, Titular Archbishop of Myra (1637); and Matthieu de Castro Malo, Vicar Apostolic of Great Mogul (1637).

Catholic Church titles
Preceded by Cristóforo Chrisostome Carletti	Bishop of Termia; 1634–1644	Succeeded by Giovanni Camponeschi
