= Cristóbal Rodríguez Juárez =

Spanish Roman Catholic prelate

Most Reverend Cristóbal Rodríguez Juárez
- Archbishop (Personal Title) of Arequipa
- Church: Catholic Church
- Diocese: Diocese of Arequipa
- In office: 1612–1613
- Predecessor: Antonio de Hervias
- Successor: Juan de las Cabezas Altamirano
- Previous post: Archbishop of Santo Domingo (1608–1612)

Personal details
- Born: 1547 Salamanca, Spain
- Died: 4 November 1613 (age 66) Arequipa

Cristóbal Rodríguez Juárez (also Cristóbal Rodríguez Suárez) (1547 – 4 November 1613) was a Roman Catholic prelate who served as the second Archbishop (Personal Title) of Arequipa (1612–1613) and Archbishop of Santo Domingo (1608–1612).

== Biography ==
Cristóbal Rodríguez Juárez was born in Salamanca, Spain and ordained a priest in the Order of Preachers. On 2 June 1608, he was appointed by the King of Spain and confirmed by Pope Paul V as Archbishop of Santo Domingo. On 16 January 1612, he was appointed by Pope Paul V as Archbishop (Personal Title) of Arequipa where served until his death on 4 November 1613.

== External links and additional sources ==
- Cheney, David M. "Archdiocese of Santo Domingo". Catholic-Hierarchy.org. (for Chronology of Bishops) ^{[self-published]}
- Chow, Gabriel. "Metropolitan Archdiocese of Santo Domingo". GCatholic.org. (for Chronology of Bishops) ^{[self-published]}
- Cheney, David M. "Archdiocese of Arequipa". Catholic-Hierarchy.org. (for Chronology of Bishops) ^{[self-published]}
- Chow, Gabriel. "Metropolitan Archdiocese of Arequipa". GCatholic.org. (for Chronology of Bishops) ^{[self-published]}

Religious titles
Preceded by Domingo Valderrama y Centeno	Archbishop of Santo Domingo; 1608–1612	Succeeded by Diego de Contreras
Preceded by Antonio de Hervias	Archbishop (Personal Title) of Arequipa; 1612–1613	Succeeded by Juan de las Cabezas Altamirano
