= Fernando Núñez Sagredo =

Most Reverend Fernando Núñez Sagredo
- Bishop of Nicaragua
- Church: Catholic Church
- Diocese: Diocese of Nicaragua
- In office: 1631–1639
- Predecessor: Juan Barahona Zapata del Águila
- Successor: Miguel de Poblete Casasola

Orders
- Consecration: 8 July 1633 by Luis de Cañizares

Personal details
- Died: 31 March 1639 León, Nicaragua

Fernando Núñez Sagredo (died 31 March 1639) was a Roman Catholic prelate who served as Bishop of Nicaragua (1631–1639).

== Biography ==
Fernando Núñez Sagredo was ordained a priest in the Order of the Most Holy Trinity. On 3 December 1631, he was appointed during the papacy of Pope Urban VIII as Bishop of Nicaragua. On 8 July 1633, he was consecrated bishop by Luis de Cañizares, Bishop of Comayagua. He served as Bishop of Nicaragua until his death on 31 March 1639.

== External links and additional sources ==
- Cheney, David M. "Diocese of León en Nicaragua". Catholic-Hierarchy.org. (for Chronology of Bishops) ^{[self-published]}
- Chow, Gabriel. "Diocese of León (Nicaragua)". GCatholic.org. (for Chronology of Bishops) ^{[self-published]}

Catholic Church titles
Preceded by Juan Barahona Zapata del Águila	Bishop of Nicaragua; 1631–1639	Succeeded by Miguel de Poblete Casasola
