= Pedro Gómez de Córdoba =

Spanish Roman Catholic prelate

Most Reverend Pedro Gómez de Córdoba
- Bishop of Santiago de Guatemala
- Church: Catholic Church
- Diocese: Diocese of Santiago de Guatemala
- In office: 1574–1598
- Predecessor: Bernardino de Villalpando
- Successor: Juan Ramírez de Arellano (bishop)
- Previous post: Bishop of Nicaragua (1568–1574)

Personal details
- Born: Granada, Spain
- Died: July 1598 Guatemala City, Guatemala

Pedro Gómez de Córdoba, O.S.H. or Jerónimo Gómez Fernández de Córdoba or Pedro Gómez Fernández de Córdoba or Gómez Fernández de Córdoba y Santillán (died July 1598) was a Roman Catholic prelate who served as Bishop of Santiago de Guatemala (1574–1598) and Bishop of Nicaragua (1568–1574).

== Biography ==
Pedro Gómez de Córdoba was born in Granada, Spain and ordained a priest in the Order of Saint Jerome. On 2 June 1568, he was appointed during the papacy of Pope Pius V as Bishop of Nicaragua. On 18 June 1574, he was appointed during the papacy of Pope Gregory XIII as Bishop of Santiago de Guatemala. In 1585, he attended the Third Mexican Provincial Council. Córdoba died in July 1598.

== External links and additional sources ==
- Cheney, David M. "Diocese of León en Nicaragua". Catholic-Hierarchy.org. (for Chronology of Bishops) ^{[self-published]}
- Chow, Gabriel. "Diocese of León (Nicaragua)". GCatholic.org. (for Chronology of Bishops) ^{[self-published]}
- Cheney, David M. "Archdiocese of Guatemala". Catholic-Hierarchy.org. (for Chronology of Bishops) ^{[self-published]}
- Chow, Gabriel. "Metropolitan Archdiocese of Santiago de Guatemala". GCatholic.org. (for Chronology of Bishops) ^{[self-published]}

Catholic Church titles
Preceded by Luís de la Fuente (bishop)	Bishop of Nicaragua; 1568–1574	Succeeded by Antonio de Zayas (bishop)
Preceded by Bernardino de Villalpando	Bishop of Santiago de Guatemala; 1574–1598	Succeeded by Juan Ramírez de Arellano (bishop)
