= Andrés de las Navas y Quevedo =

Spanish Roman Catholic prelate

Most Reverend Andrés de las Navas y Quevedo O. de M.
- Bishop of Santiago de Guatemala
- Church: Catholic Church
- Diocese: Diocese of Santiago de Guatemala
- In office: 1682–1702
- Predecessor: Juan de Ortega Cano Montañez y Patiño
- Successor: Mauro de Larreátegui y Colón
- Previous post: Bishop of Nicaragua (1677–1682)

Orders
- Ordination: 1660
- Consecration: 30 November 1678 by Juan Ortega y Montañés

Personal details
- Born: 1632 Baza, Kingdom of Granada, Crown of Castile
- Died: 2 November 1702 (aged 69–70) Santiago de Guatemala, Guatemala, New Spain, Spanish Empire

Andrés de las Navas y Quevedo, O. de M. (1632 – 2 November 1702) was a Roman Catholic prelate who served as Bishop of Santiago de Guatemala (1682–1702) and Bishop of Nicaragua (1677–1682).

== Biography ==
Pedro Gómez de Córdoba was born in Baza, Spain and ordained a priest in 1660 in the Order of the Blessed Virgin Mary of Mercy. On 13 September 1677, he was appointed during the papacy of Pope Innocent XI as Bishop of Nicaragua. On 13 September 1677, he was consecrated bishop by Juan de Ortega Cano Montañez y Patiño, Bishop of Santiago de Guatemala and installed on 23 February 1679. On 15 June 1682, he was selected by the King of Spain and confirmed by Pope Innocent XI on 15 February 1683 as Bishop of Santiago de Guatemala. He was installed on 24 March 1683. He served as Bishop of Santiago de Guatemala until his death on 2 November 1702.

While bishop, he was the principal consecrator of Ildefonso Vargas y Abarca, Bishop of Comayagua (1679).

== External links and additional sources ==
- Cheney, David M. "Diocese of León en Nicaragua". Catholic-Hierarchy.org. (for Chronology of Bishops) ^{[self-published]}
- Chow, Gabriel. "Diocese of León (Nicaragua)". GCatholic.org. (for Chronology of Bishops) ^{[self-published]}
- Cheney, David M. "Archdiocese of Guatemala". Catholic-Hierarchy.org. (for Chronology of Bishops) ^{[self-published]}
- Chow, Gabriel. "Metropolitan Archdiocese of Santiago de Guatemala". GCatholic.org. (for Chronology of Bishops) ^{[self-published]}

Catholic Church titles
Preceded by Alfonso Bravo de Laguna	Bishop of Nicaragua; 1677–1682	Succeeded by Juan de Rojas y Asúa
Preceded by Juan de Ortega Cano Montañez y Patiño	Bishop of Santiago de Guatemala; 1682–1702	Succeeded by Mauro de Larreátegui y Colón
