= Lázaro Carrasco =

Most Reverend Lázaro Carrasco
- Bishop Elect of Nicaragua
- Church: Catholic Church
- Diocese: Diocese of Nicaragua
- In office: 1556–1562
- Predecessor: Fernando González de Bariodero
- Successor: Luís de la Fuente (bishop)

Personal details
- Died: 20 November 1562 León, Nicaragua

Lázaro Carrasco (died 20 Nov 1562) was a Roman Catholic prelate who served as Bishop of Nicaragua (1556–1562).

== Biography ==
In 1556, Lázaro Carrasco was appointed during the papacy of Pope Paul IV as Bishop of Nicaragua and arrived in Nicaragua in 1557. He was never consecrated bishop and died on 20 Nov 1562 as Bishop Elect of Nicaragua.

== See also ==
- Catholic Church in Nicaragua

== External links and additional sources ==
- Cheney, David M. "Diocese of León en Nicaragua". Catholic-Hierarchy.org. (for Chronology of Bishops) ^{[self-published]}
- Chow, Gabriel. "Diocese of León (Nicaragua)". GCatholic.org. (for Chronology of Bishops) ^{[self-published]}

Catholic Church titles
Preceded by Fernando González de Bariodero	Bishop Elect of Nicaragua; 1556–1562	Succeeded by Luís de la Fuente (bishop)
