= Nicolás Delgado =

Most Reverend Nicolás Delgado
- Bishop of Nicaragua
- Church: Catholic Church
- Diocese: Diocese of Nicaragua
- In office: 1687–1698
- Predecessor: Juan de Rojas y Asúa
- Successor: Diego Morcillo Rubio de Suñón de Robledo

Personal details
- Died: 25 November 1698 León, Nicaragua

Nicolás Delgado, O.F.M. (died 25 November 1698) was a Roman Catholic prelate who served as Bishop of Nicaragua (1687–1698).

== Biography ==
Nicolás Delgado was ordained a priest in the Order of Friars Minor. On 2 May 1687, he was appointed during the papacy of Pope Innocent XI as Bishop of Nicaragua and installed on 22 December 1688. He served as Bishop of Nicaragua until his death on 25 November 1698.

== External links and additional sources ==
- Cheney, David M. "Diocese of León en Nicaragua". Catholic-Hierarchy.org. (for Chronology of Bishops) ^{[self-published]}
- Chow, Gabriel. "Diocese of León (Nicaragua)". GCatholic.org. (for Chronology of Bishops) ^{[self-published]}

Catholic Church titles
Preceded by Juan de Rojas y Asúa	Bishop of Nicaragua; 1687–1698	Succeeded by Diego Morcillo Rubio de Suñón de Robledo
