= Bartolomé de la Plaza =

Most Reverend Bartolomé de la Plaza
- Bishop of Santiago de Cuba
- Church: Catholic Church
- Archdiocese: Diocese of Santiago de Cuba
- In office: 1597–1602
- Predecessor: Juan Antonio Diaz de Salcedo
- Successor: Juan de las Cabezas Altamirano

Orders
- Consecration: 1598

Personal details
- Born: Spain
- Died: 1602 Santiago de Cuba

Bartolomé de la Plaza (died 1602) was a Roman Catholic prelate who served as Bishop of Santiago de Cuba (1597–1602).

== Biography ==
Bartolomé de la Plaza was born in Spain and ordained a priest in the Order of Friars Minor. On 10 November 1597, he was appointed during the papacy of Pope Clement VIII as Bishop of Santiago de Cuba. In 1598, he was consecrated bishop. He served as Bishop of Santiago de Cuba until his death in 1602.

== External links and additional sources ==
- Cheney, David M. "Archdiocese of Santiago de Cuba". Catholic-Hierarchy.org. (for Chronology of Bishops) ^{[self-published]}
- Chow, Gabriel. "Metropolitan Archdiocese of Santiago". GCatholic.org. (for Chronology of Bishops) ^{[self-published]}

Catholic Church titles
Preceded by Juan Antonio Diaz de Salcedo	Bishop of Santiago de Cuba; 1597–1602	Succeeded by Juan de las Cabezas Altamirano
