= Juan de la Torre y Castro =

Nicaraguan prelate (1607–1662)

Most Reverend Juan de la Torre y Castro
- Bishop of Nicaragua
- Church: Catholic Church
- Diocese: Diocese of Nicaragua
- In office: 1661–1662
- Predecessor: Tomás Manso
- Successor: Alfonso Bravo de Laguna

Orders
- Consecration: Diego Osorio de Escobar y Llamas by 1662

Personal details
- Born: 1607 Arrancarra de Aranxo, Spain
- Died: December 1662 (age 55) León, Nicaragua

Juan de la Torre y Castro or Juan de la Torres y Castro (1607 – December 1662) was a Roman Catholic prelate who served as Bishop of Nicaragua (1661–1662).

== Biography ==
Juan de la Torre y Castro was born in Arrancarra de Aranxo, Spain and ordained a priest in the Order of Friars Minor. On 19 December 1661, he was appointed during the papacy of Pope Alexander VII as Bishop of Nicaragua. In 1662, he was consecrated bishop by Diego Osorio de Escobar y Llamas, Bishop of Puebla. He died six days after arriving in Nicaragua in December 1662. Alfonso Bravo de Laguna, who served as Vicar Capitular since 1660 after the death of Tomás Manso, was appointed the next Bishop.

== External links and additional sources ==
- Cheney, David M. "Diocese of León en Nicaragua". Catholic-Hierarchy.org. (for Chronology of Bishops) ^{[self-published]}
- Chow, Gabriel. "Diocese of León (Nicaragua)". GCatholic.org. (for Chronology of Bishops) ^{[self-published]}

Catholic Church titles
Preceded by Tomás Manso	Bishop of Nicaragua; 1661–1662	Succeeded by Alfonso Bravo de Laguna
