= Pedro de Villarreal =

Most Reverend Pedro de Villarreal
- Bishop of Nicaragua
- Church: Catholic Church
- Diocese: Diocese of Nicaragua
- In office: 1603–1619
- Predecessor: Juan Antonio Diaz de Salcedo
- Successor: Benito Rodríguez Valtodano

Orders
- Consecration: 31 January 1604 by Pedro Castro Quiñones

Personal details
- Born: Andujar, Spain
- Died: 1619 León, Nicaragua

Pedro de Villarreal (died 1619) was a Roman Catholic prelate who served as Bishop of Nicaragua (1603–1619).

== Biography ==
Pedro de Villarreal was born in Andujar, Spain. On 22 October 1603, he was appointed during the papacy of Pope Clement VIII as Bishop of Nicaragua. On 31 January 1604, he was consecrated bishop by Pedro Castro Quiñones, Archbishop of Granada. He served as Bishop of Nicaragua until his death in 1619.

== External links and additional sources ==
- Cheney, David M. "Diocese of León en Nicaragua". Catholic-Hierarchy.org. (for Chronology of Bishops) ^{[self-published]}
- Chow, Gabriel. "Diocese of León (Nicaragua)". GCatholic.org. (for Chronology of Bishops) ^{[self-published]}

Catholic Church titles
Preceded by Juan Antonio Diaz de Salcedo	Bishop of Nicaragua; 1603–1619	Succeeded by Benito Rodríguez Valtodano
