= Francisco de Mendavia =

Roman Catholic prelate

Most Reverend Francisco de Mendavia
- Bishop of Nicaragua
- Church: Catholic Church
- Diocese: Diocese of Nicaragua
- In office: 1537–1540
- Predecessor: Diego Alvarez de Osorio
- Successor: Antonio de Valdivieso

Orders
- Consecration: 2 August 1538

Personal details
- Died: 6 October 1540 León, Nicaragua

Francisco de Mendavia (died 6 October 1540) was a Roman Catholic prelate who was the Bishop of Nicaragua (1537–1540).

== Biography ==
Francisco de Mendavia was ordained a monk in the Order of Saint Jerome and served as prior of the Monastery of La Victoria in Salamanca. On 5 December 1537, he was appointed during the papacy of Pope Paul III as Bishop of Nicaragua. On 2 August 1538, he was consecrated bishop, a post he held until his death on 6 October 1540.

== External links and additional sources ==
- Cheney, David M. "Diocese of León en Nicaragua". Catholic-Hierarchy. (for Chronology of Bishops) ^{[self-published]}
- Chow, Gabriel. "Diocese of León (Nicaragua)". GCatholic. (for Chronology of Bishops) ^{[self-published]}

Catholic Church titles
Preceded by Diego Alvarez de Osorio	Bishop of Nicaragua; 1537–1540	Succeeded by Antonio de Valdivieso
