= Marcos Ramírez de Prado y Ovando =

Spanish Roman Catholic prelate

Most Reverend Marcos Ramírez de Prado y Ovando O.F.M
- Archbishop of Mexico
- Church: Catholic Church
- Archdiocese: Archdiocese of Mexico
- Predecessor: Juan Alonso de Cuevas y Davalos
- Successor: Payo Afán Enríquez de Ribera Manrique de Lara
- Previous posts: Bishop of Chiapas (1632–1639); Bishop of Michoacán (1639–1666)

Orders
- Consecration: June 6, 1633 by Juan Guzmán

Personal details
- Born: April 24, 1592 Madrid, Spain
- Died: May 14, 1667 (aged 75) Mexico City

Marcos Ramírez de Prado y Ovando O.F.M. (April 24, 1592 – May 14, 1667) was a Roman Catholic prelate who served as Archbishop of Mexico (1666–1667), Bishop of Michoacán (1639–1666), and Bishop of Chiapas (1632–1639).

== Biography ==
Ovando was born in Madrid, Spain, and ordained a priest in the Order of Friars Minor. On October 9, 1632, he was selected by the King of Spain and confirmed on January 31, 1633 by Pope Urban VIII as Bishop of Chiapas. On June 6, 1633, he was consecrated bishop by Juan Guzman, Archbishop of Zaragoza with Juan Bravo Lagunas, Bishop of Ugento, and Miguel Avellán, Auxiliary Bishop of Toledo, as co-consecrators. On May 30, 1639, he was selected by the King of Spain and confirmed by Pope Urban VIII as Bishop of Michoacán. He was installed on March 17, 1640. On December 15, 1666, he was selected by the King of Spain and confirmed by Pope Alexander VII as Archbishop of Mexico where he served until his death on May 14, 1667.

== Episcopal succession ==
While bishop, Ovando was the principal consecrator of:

- Juan Ruiz de Colmenero, Bishop of Guadalajara (1647);
- Juan López, Bishop of Cebu (1665);
- Francisco Verdín y Molina, Bishop of Guadalajara (1666);

and principal co-consecrator of:

- Mendo de Benavides, Bishop of Segovia (1634).

== External links and additional sources ==
- Cheney, David M. "Diocese of San Cristóbal de Las Casas". Catholic-Hierarchy.org. (for Chronology of Bishops) ^{[self-published]}
- Chow, Gabriel. "Diocese of San Cristóbal de Las Casas". GCatholic.org. (for Chronology of Bishops) ^{[self-published]}
- Cheney, David M. "Archdiocese of Morelia". Catholic-Hierarchy.org. (for Chronology of Bishops) ^{[self-published]}
- Chow, Gabriel. "Metropolitan Archdiocese of Morelia (Mexico)". GCatholic.org. (for Chronology of Bishops) ^{[self-published]}

Catholic Church titles
| Preceded by Agustín de Ugarte y Sarabia | Bishop of Chiapas; 1632–1639 | Succeeded by Cristóbal Pérez Lazarraga y Maneli Viana |
| Preceded by Francisco de Rivera y Pareja | Bishop of Michoacán; 1639–1666 | Succeeded by Payo Afán Enríquez de Ribera Manrique de Lara |
| Preceded by Juan Alonso de Cuevas y Davalos | Archbishop of Mexico; 1666–1667 | Succeeded by Payo Afán Enríquez de Ribera Manrique de Lara |
