= Juan Francisco Leiva y de la Cerda =

Spanish nobleman and viceroy of New Spain

Juan Francisco de Leiva y de la Cerda Marquess of Adrada, Count of Baños
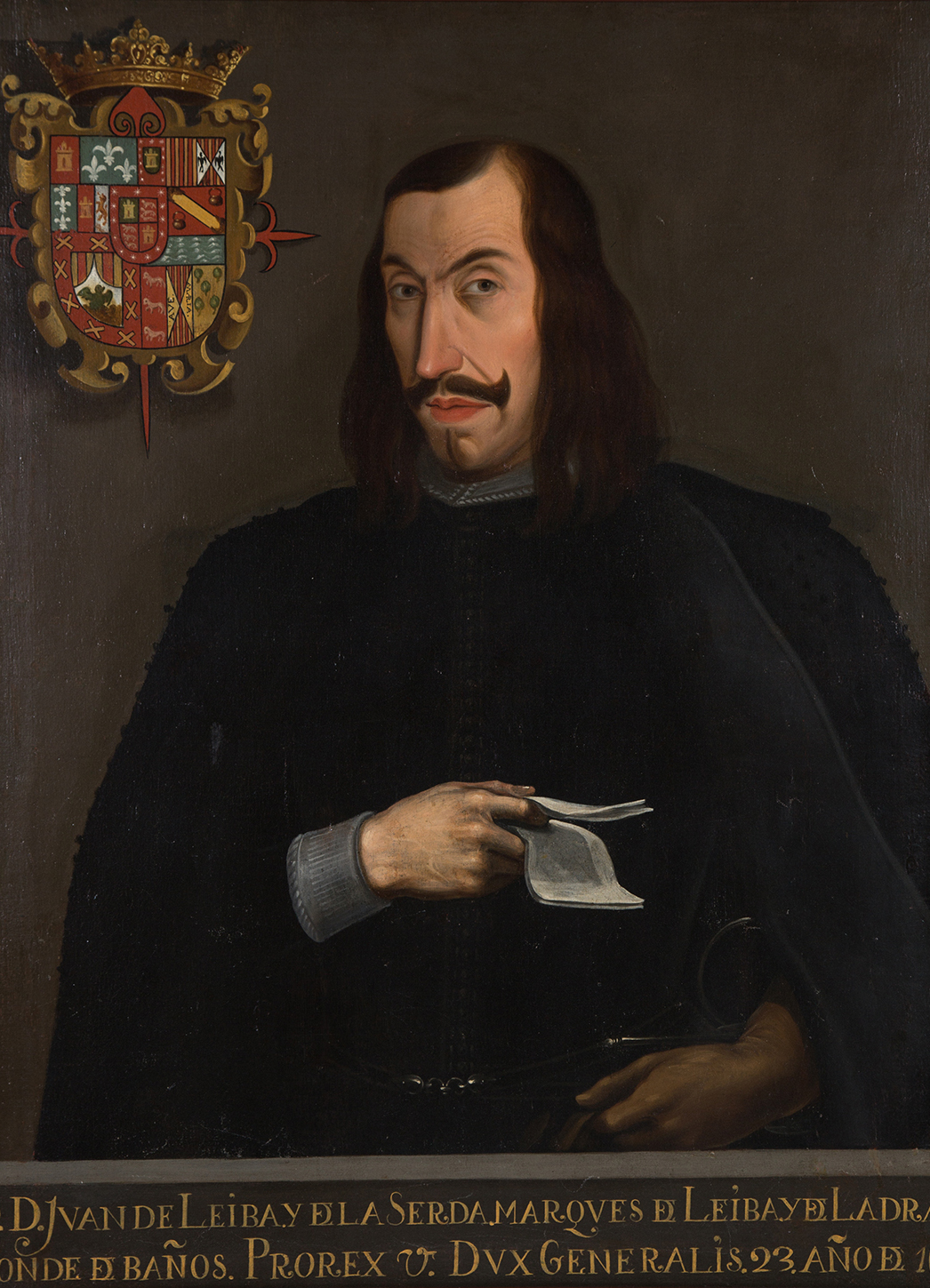

23rd Viceroy of New Spain
- In office 16 September 1660 – 29 June 1664
- Monarch: Philip IV
- Valido: Luis de Haro
- Preceded by: Francisco Fernández de la Cueva y Enriquez de Cabrera
- Succeeded by: Diego Osorio de Escobar y Llamas

Personal details
- Born: 2 February 1604 Alcalá de Henares, Spain
- Died: 27 March 1678 (aged 74) Guadalajara, Spain

Juan Francisco de Leyva y de la Cerda, 5th Marquess of Adrada, iure uxoris 2nd Count of Baños (2 February 1604 – 27 March 1678) was a Spanish nobleman and viceroy of New Spain from 16 September 1660 to 28 June 1664.

== Early career ==
De Leyva de la Cerda was a member of the old nobility of Spain. At the side of his maternal grandfather, Pedro de Leyva y Mendoza, capitan general of the galleys of Spain, Naples and Sicily, he entered the service of the Crown at a young age in the navy. He fought against Algerian pirates and later, in 1626, Catalan rebels of Tarragona.

He was named viceroy of New Spain under King Philip IV on 26 February 1660, at the age of 56. He entered the capital of the viceroyalty on 16 September 1660, accompanied by his family. Leyva de la Cerda had a reputation for arrogance, rudeness and unlimited cupidity, as did members of his family. His term as viceroy was not a success.

== Abuses as viceroy ==
Shortly after his arrival, the viceroy's son Pedro had an altercation with a servant of the conde de Santiago. He killed the servant with his sword. When the conde reproached him for his conduct, Pedro de Leyva hired some assassins to kill the conde. This did not succeed, and resulted in hatred of the viceroy and his family among the aristocracy of the viceroyalty. A long stream of complaints and accusations were received in Madrid.

The excesses and abuses of his subordinates provoked the revolt of various groups of Indians. The most notable of these occurred in 1661, when the Indians of Tehuantepec, led by the mayor, Juan Arellano, rose in rebellion. They were pacified by the intervention and mediation of the bishop of Oaxaca, Alonso Cuevas Dávalos.

In 1662 the viceroy ordered a change in the route of the procession of Corpus so that it would pass in front of the palace, where his wife could view it from her balcony. The chapter of the cathedral made strong protests, and the Court not only disapproved the viceroy's decision, but also fined him twelve thousand ducats.

He seized lands and properties to give them to his family and friends and to cover a loan of 200,000 pesos the treasury of New Spain had advanced to the Spanish Crown. (In 1662 he appropriated the lands around his country estate so that the retainers who accompanied him on his visits could live there.) Also in 1662 he seized the merchandise arriving in Veracruz from Europe in order to require the Mexico City merchants for whom it was intended to contribute immediately to the funds he was remitting to Spain.

== Return to Spain ==
When the complaints against the viceroy had reached an intolerable level, the Crown relieved him of his position and appointed Diego Osorio de Escobar y Llamas, bishop of Puebla, to serve as interim viceroy. However, de Leyva de la Cerda intercepted the orders of the Crown and continued to govern until the bishop arrived in the capital and publicly enforced his authority. De Leyva's departure from the capital was humiliating, accompanied by whistles, catcalls and stone-throwing, but also by the great relief of the people he had antagonized.

Leyva sailed for Spain on 15 September 1664. When he presented himself at Court, he was severely reprimanded by the king, and barred permanently from service to the Court. Embittered after his wife died, he entered a Carmelite monastery in Madrid. There he took the name Fray Juan de San José. He sang his first mass on 27 October 1676. He retired to the monastery of San Pedro in Guadalajara, where he died in 1678.

Political offices
Preceded by Francisco Fernández de la Cueva y Enriquez de Cabrera	Viceroy of New Spain; 1660 – 1664	Succeeded by Diego Osorio de Escobar y Llamas
