= Juan de Rojas y Asúa =

Most Reverend Juan de Rojas y Asúa
- Bishop of Nicaragua
- Church: Catholic Church
- Diocese: Diocese of Nicaragua
- In office: 1683–1685
- Predecessor: Andrés de las Navas y Quevedo
- Successor: Nicolás Delgado

Orders
- Consecration: 10 April 1683

Personal details
- Born: 1622 Buenache de Alarcón, Spain
- Died: 25 November 1685 (age 63) Metapa, Nicaragua

Juan de Rojas y Asúa (1622 – 25 November 1685) was a Roman Catholic prelate who served as Bishop of Nicaragua (1683–1685).

== Biography ==
In 1644, Juan de Rojas y Asúa was ordained a priest of the Order of the Blessed Virgin Mary of Mercy. On 14 December 1682, he was selected by the king of Spain and confirmed on 8 March 1683 by Pope Innocent XI as Bishop of Nicaragua. On 10 April 1683, he was consecrated bishop and in January 1684, he was installed bishop. He served as Bishop of Nicaragua until his death in on 25 November 1685 in Metapa, Nicaragua while on a pastoral visit.

== External links and additional sources ==
- Cheney, David M. "Diocese of León en Nicaragua". Catholic-Hierarchy.org. (for Chronology of Bishops) ^{[self-published]}
- Chow, Gabriel. "Diocese of León (Nicaragua)". GCatholic.org. (for Chronology of Bishops) ^{[self-published]}

Catholic Church titles
Preceded by Andrés de las Navas y Quevedo	Bishop of Nicaragua; 1683–1685	Succeeded by Nicolás Delgado
