= Luís de Cifuentes y Sotomayor =

Spanish Roman Catholic prelate

Most Reverend Luís de Cifuentes y Sotomayor
- Bishop of Yucatán
- Church: Catholic Church
- Diocese: Diocese of Yucatán
- In office: 1659–1676
- Predecessor: Lorenzo Horta Rodríguez
- Successor: Juan de Escalante Turcios y Mendoza

Orders
- Consecration: Diego Osorio de Escobar y Llamas by 25 July 1660

Personal details
- Born: 1600 Seville, Crown of Castille
- Died: May 18, 1676 (aged 75–76) Yucatán, New Spain

Luís de Cifuentes y Sotomayor OP (1600 – 18 May 1676) was a Roman Catholic prelate who served as Bishop of Yucatán (1659–1676).

== Biography ==
Luís de Cifuentes y Sotomayor was born in Seville, Spain in 1600 and ordained a priest in the Order of Preachers. On 22 September 1659, he was appointed during the papacy of Pope Alexander VII as Bishop of Yucatán. On 25 July 1660, he was consecrated bishop by Diego Osorio de Escobar y Llamas, Bishop of Tlaxcala. He served as Bishop of Yucatán until his death on 18 May 1676. While bishop, he was the principal consecrator of Juan de Escalante Turcios y Mendoza, Archbishop of Santo Domingo (1673).

== External links and additional sources ==
- Cheney, David M. "Archdiocese of Yucatán". Catholic-Hierarchy.org. (for Chronology of Bishops) ^{[self-published]}
- Chow, Gabriel. "Metropolitan Archdiocese of Yucatán". GCatholic.org. (for Chronology of Bishops) ^{[self-published]}

Catholic Church titles
Preceded by Lorenzo Horta Rodríguez	Bishop of Yucatán; 1659–1676	Succeeded by Juan de Escalante Turcios y Mendoza
