= Petrus Pitarca =

Most Reverend Petrus Pitarca
- Bishop of Termia
- Church: Catholic Church
- Diocese: Diocese of Termia
- In office: 1617–1622
- Successor: Cristóforo Chrisostome Carletti

Orders
- Consecration: 3 September 1617 by Pietro Aldobrandini

Personal details
- Died: 1622 Kythnos, Greece

Petrus Pitarca (died 1622) was a Roman Catholic prelate who served as Bishop of Termia (1617–1622).

== Biography ==
Petrus Pitarca was ordained a priest in the Order of Friars Minor. On 26 June 1617, he was appointed during the papacy of Pope Paul V as Bishop of Termia. On 3 September 1617, he was consecrated bishop by Pietro Aldobrandini, Archbishop of Ravenna, with Attilio Amalteo, Titular Archbishop of Athenae, and Giulio Sansedoni, Bishop Emeritus of Grosseto serving as co-consecrators. He served as Bishop of Termia until his death in 1622. While bishop, he was the principal co-consecrator of Gregorius Pedrocca, Bishop of Acqui (1620).

Catholic Church titles
Preceded by	Bishop of Termia; 1617–1622	Succeeded by Cristóforo Chrisostome Carletti
