= José Sarmiento de Valladares, 1st Duke of Atrisco =

Mexican politician

The Duke of Atrisco
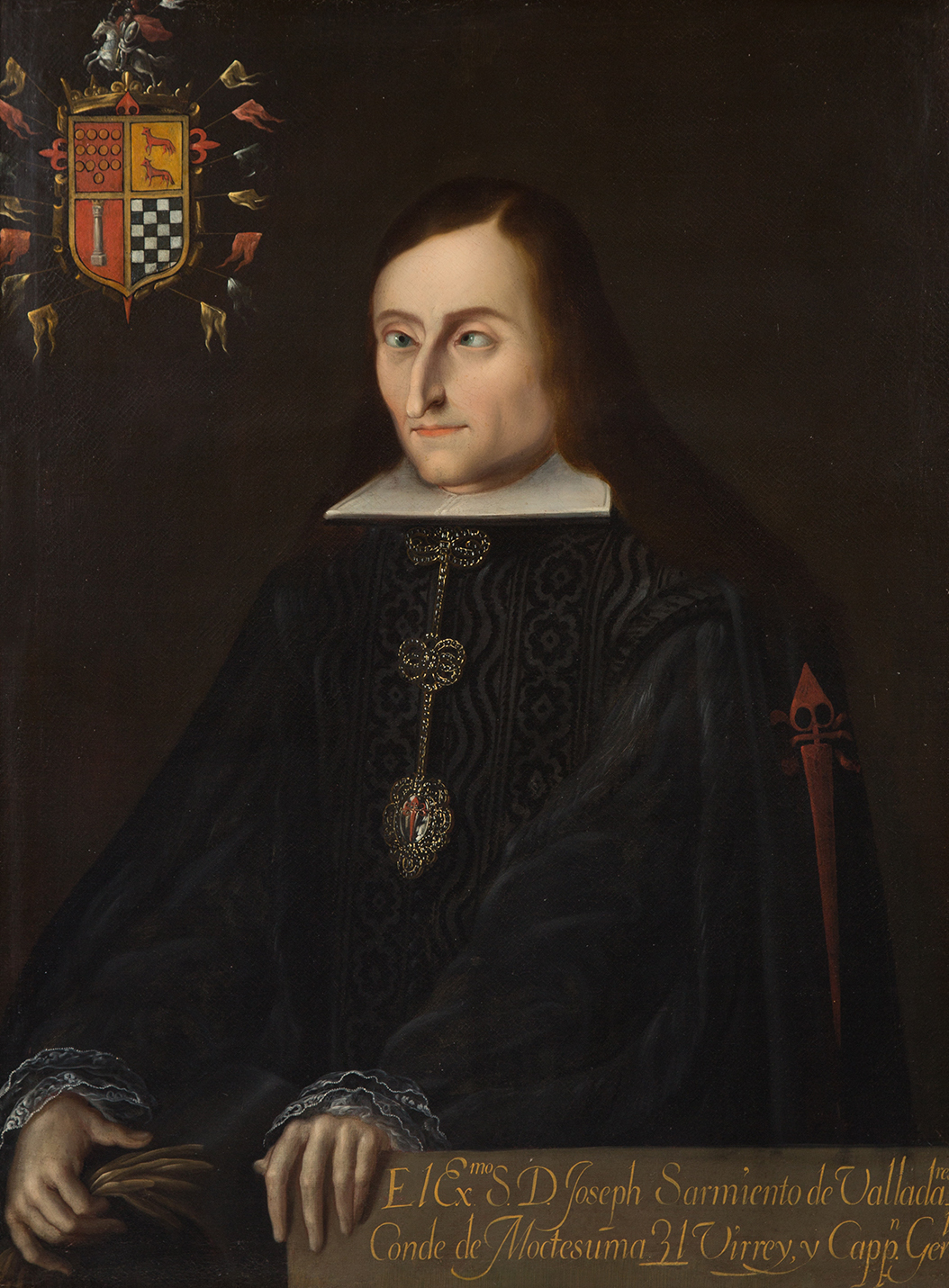

Viceroy of New Spain
- In office December 18, 1696 – November 3, 1701
- Monarch: Charles II
- Preceded by: Juan Ortega y Montañés
- Succeeded by: Juan Ortega y Montañés

Personal details
- Born: May 4, 1643 San Roman de Saxamonde, Galicia, Spain
- Died: September 10, 1708 (aged 65) Madrid, Spain
- Spouse: María Jerónima Moctezuma y Jofre de Loaiza

José Sarmiento de Valladares Arines-Troncoso de Romay, 1st Duke of Atrisco, jure uxoris Count of Moctezuma, GE (May 1643 in San Roman de Saxamonde, Galicia, Spain – September 10, 1708 in Madrid) was viceroy of New Spain from December 18, 1696 to November 3, 1701.

== Career ==
On his arrival in New Spain, he met with his viceregal predecessor, Bishop Juan Ortega y Montañés at Otumba, on the road from Veracruz to Mexico City. He entered the capital incognito on the afternoon of December 18, 1696 and was sworn in at 7 o'clock that evening, before the Audiencia. On his formal entrance into Mexico City on February 2, 1697 his horse fell, to the great amusement of the crowd.

He did what he could to help the population through the famine of 1697. He ordered that supplies of maize and wheat be kept in the public granaries to protect against future famines, and he ordered the storing of quantities of other provisions as well. He ordered that the Philippines ship mercury to New Spain, for use in the silver mines. Many mines had been closed for lack of mercury to extract the silver. He legalized the consumption of the mildly alcoholic drink pulque by the natives.

He worked to restore the viceregal palace, partially destroyed in the riots and fire of 1692. He was able to occupy it on May 25, 1697. One of his daughters, Fausta Dominga, died shortly thereafter, of smallpox.

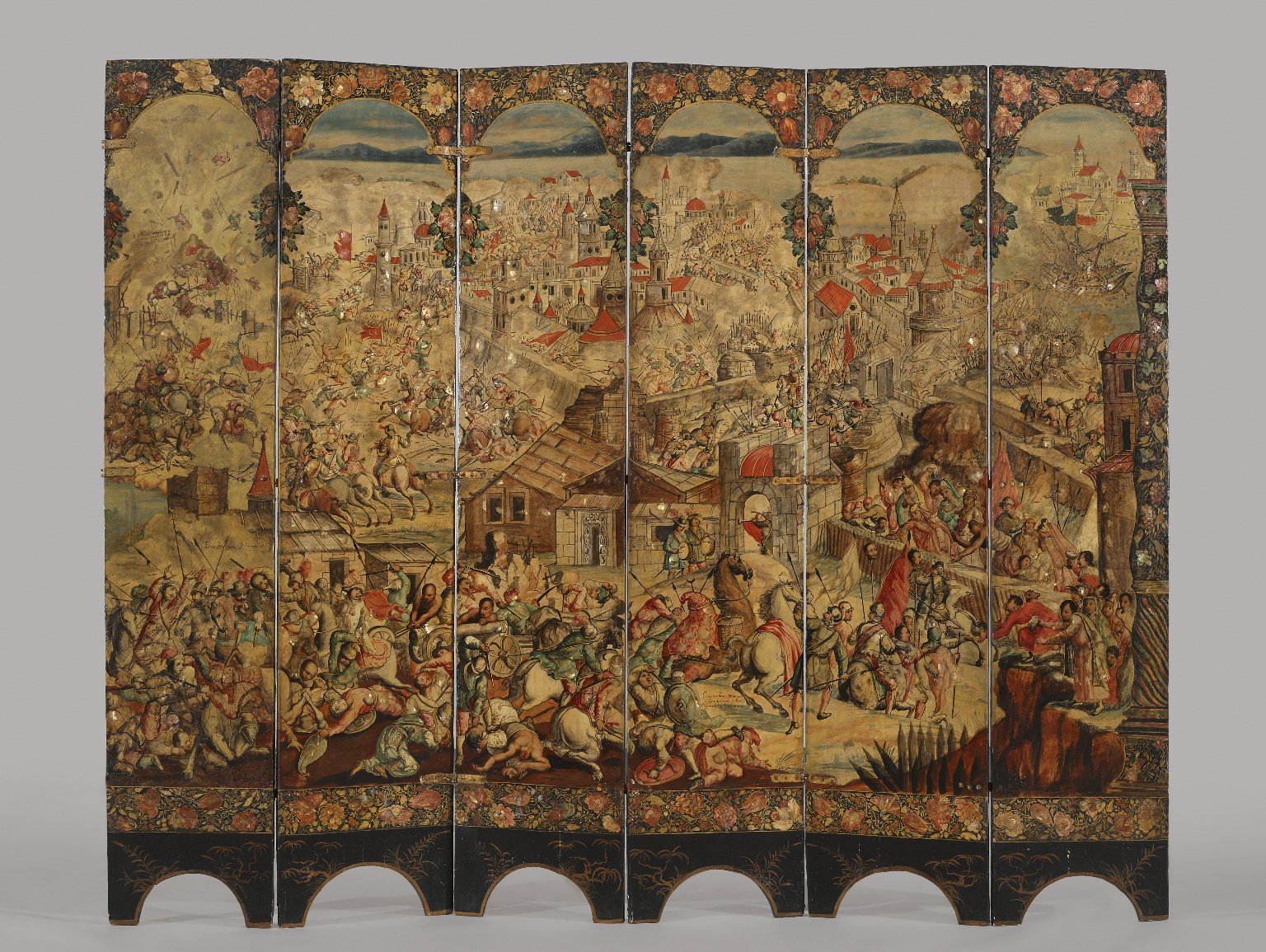
A folding screen depicting the Siege of Belgrade using the enconchado technique, commissioned by José Sarmiento de Valladares, most likely displayed in Mexico's viceregal palace. (c. 1697-1701) Brooklyn Museum

In 1700 he established the night watch in Mexico City to combat crime. The city was divided into eight wards, and a constable was placed in charge of the night watch in each ward. Offenders were to be whipped publicly on the first offense and branded on the back on the second. For a third offense the penalty was the loss of an ear. By order of March 6, 1700, assailants on the Camino Real were to suffer death. Sarmiento y Valladares also ordered that criminals and delinquents be transported to Puerto Rico.

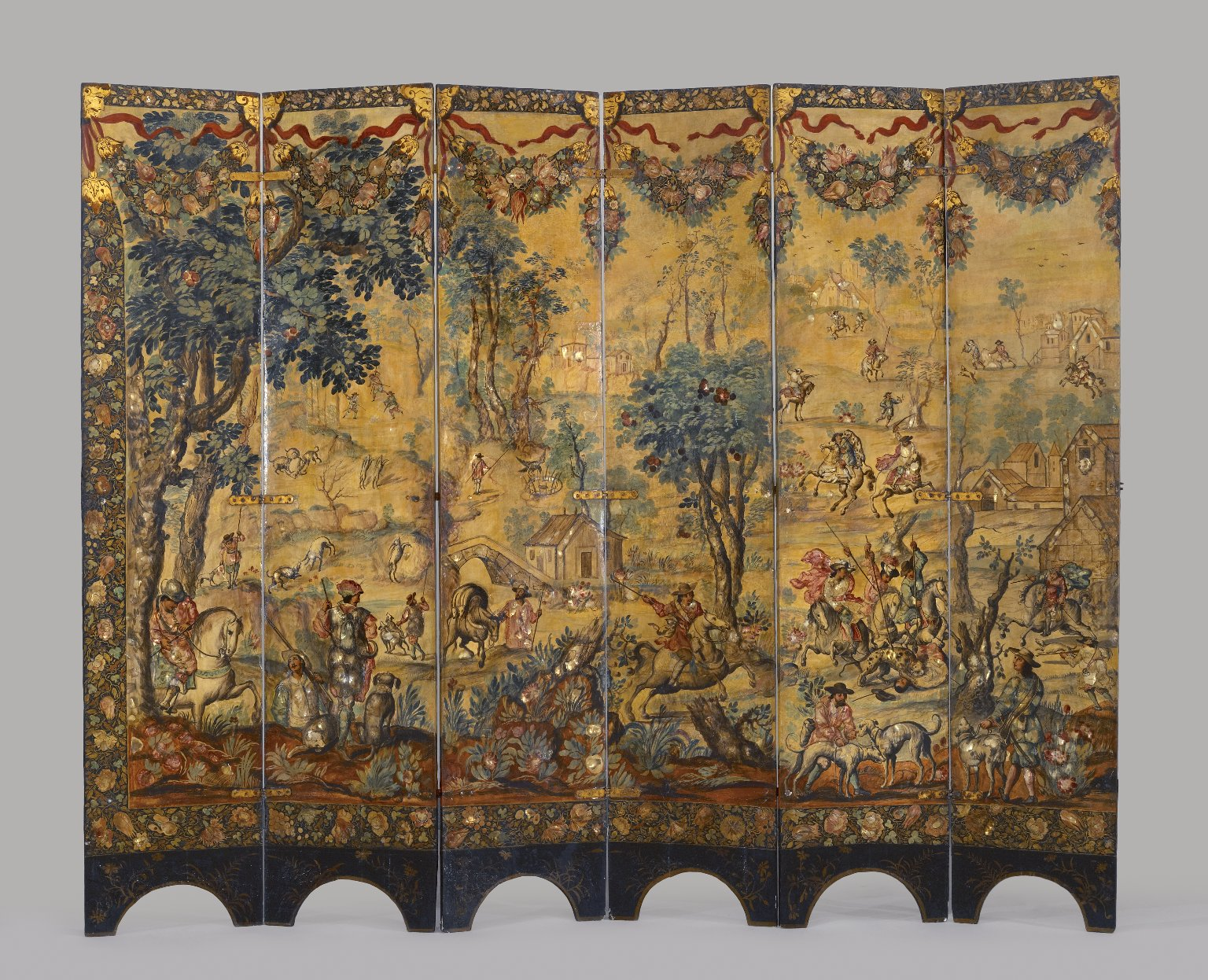
Reverse side of the folding screen, depicting a hunting scene. Brooklyn Museum

A ship arrived in Veracruz on March 6, 1701 carrying the news of the death of King Charles II of Spain on November 1, 1700. Charles II left no heir. The War of the Spanish Succession, between Spain and France on the one hand and Austria, England and Holland on the other, began, to determine his successor. Sarmiento y Valladares was publicly known as a supporter of the Habsburg claims to the Spanish throne, but the Bourbons were in control there. The viceroy was removed from office and ordered to return to Spain. Bishop Juan Ortega y Montañés was once again named interim viceroy.

Nevertheless, upon his return to Spain Sarmiento y Valladares received a pension and many honors, among them the titles of Duke of Atrisco and grandee of Spain in April 1708, he died in Madrid in September 1708. The Duchy of Atrisco succeeded the Provincial Government of Carrión in the valley of Atlixco, previously ruled by Don Diego Fernández de Medrano y Zapata from 1693 to 1706.

== Personal life ==
He was married to María Jerónima Moctezuma y Jofre de Loaiza, 3rd Countess de Moctezuma, a descendant of the last Aztec emperor. It was through her that he received his title. They had two daughters before her death. Thereafter he married a granddaughter of the Marquess de Villamanrique. His second wife accompanied him to New Spain.

Government offices
Preceded by Juan Ortega y Montañés	Viceroy of New Spain; 1696 – 1701	Succeeded by Juan Ortega y Montañés
Spanish nobility
Preceded by New creation	Duke of Atrisco; April – September 1708	Succeeded by Melchora Sarmiento de Valladares y Moctezuma
