= Benito Rodríguez Valtodano =

Most Reverend Benito Rodríguez Valtodano
- Bishop of Nicaragua
- Church: Catholic Church
- Diocese: Diocese of Nicaragua
- In office: 1620–1629
- Predecessor: Pedro de Villarreal
- Successor: Agustin de Hinojosa y Montalvo

Orders
- Consecration: 1622 by Alfonso del Galdo

Personal details
- Died: 1629 León, Nicaragua

Benito Rodríguez Valtodano or Benito Rodríguez Baltodano (died 1629) was a Roman Catholic prelate who served as Bishop of Nicaragua (1620–1629).

== Biography ==
Benito Rodríguez Valtodano was ordained a priest in the Order of Saint Benedict. On 27 August 1620, he was selected by the King of Spain and confirmed by Pope Gregory XV on 17 March 1621 as Bishop of Nicaragua. In 1622, he was consecrated bishop by Alfonso del Galdo, Bishop of Comayagua. He served as Bishop of Nicaragua until his death in 1629.

== External links and additional sources ==
- Cheney, David M. "Diocese of León en Nicaragua". Catholic-Hierarchy.org. (for Chronology of Bishops) ^{[self-published]}
- Chow, Gabriel. "Diocese of León (Nicaragua)". GCatholic.org. (for Chronology of Bishops) ^{[self-published]}

Catholic Church titles
Preceded by Pedro de Villarreal	Bishop of Nicaragua; 1620–1629	Succeeded by Agustin de Hinojosa y Montalvo
