= Bernardino de Villalpando =

Spanish Roman Catholic prelate

Most Reverend Bernardino de Villalpando
- Bishop of Santiago de Guatemala
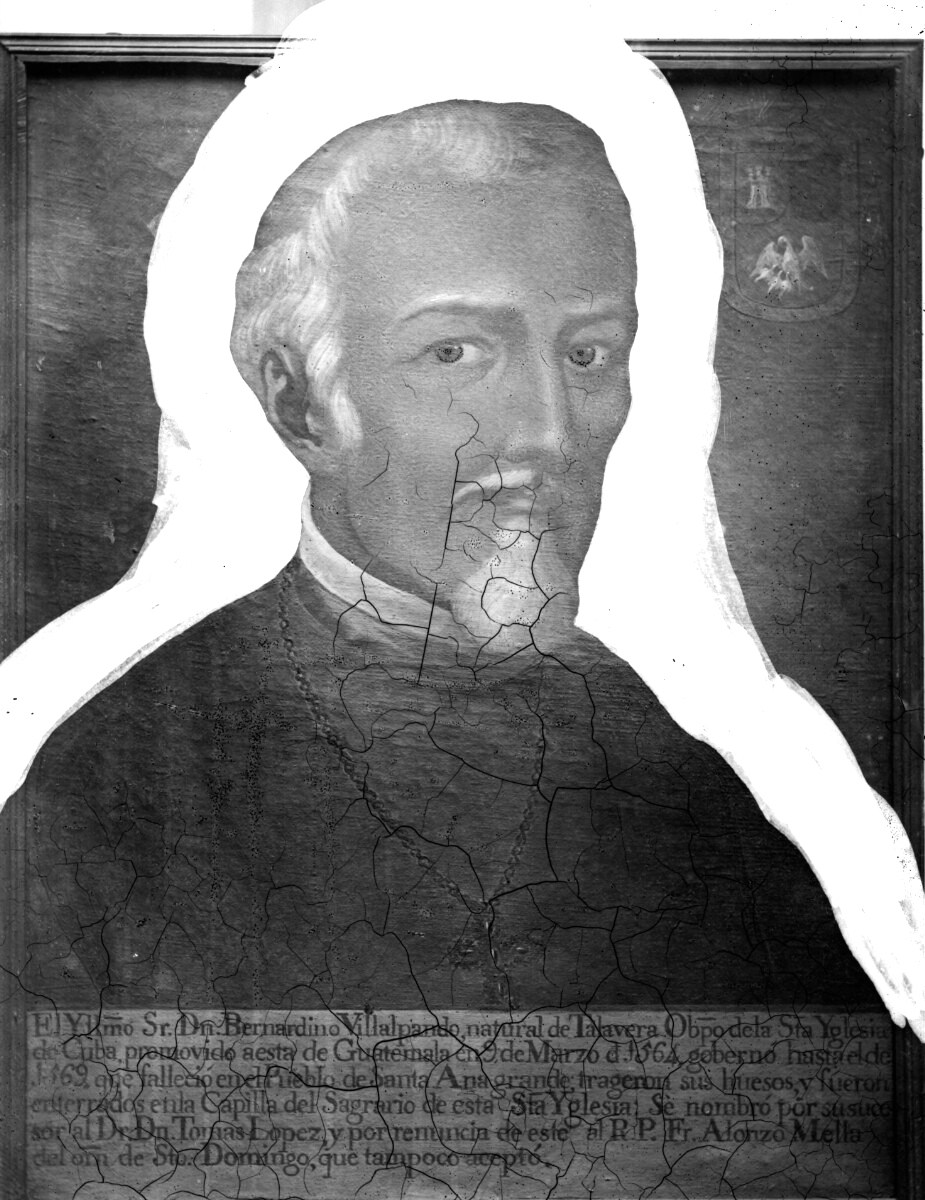
- Image of Bishop Bernardino Villalpando, who was the sixth bishop of Santiago de Cuba (from 1561 to 1564) and the second bishop of the diocese of Guatemala (from 1564 until his death in 1570)
- Church: Catholic Church
- Archdiocese: Archdiocese of Santiago de Guatemala
- Diocese: Diocese of Santiago de Guatemala
- In office: 1564–1569
- Predecessor: Francisco Marroquín Hurtado
- Successor: Pedro Gómez de Córdoba
- Previous post: Bishop of Santiago de Cuba (1561–1664)

Orders
- Consecration: by 1562

Personal details
- Born: 1500s Talavera de la Reina, Spain
- Died: August 1569 Guatemala City, Guatemala

Bernardino de Villalpando, C.R.S.A. (1500s – August 1569) was a Roman Catholic prelate who served as Bishop of Santiago de Guatemala (1564–1569) and Bishop of Santiago de Cuba (1561–1564).

== Biography ==
Bernardino de Villalpando was born in Talavera de la Reina, Spain and ordained a priest in the Canons Regular of St. Augustine. On June 27, 1561, he was appointed during the papacy of Pope Pius IV as Bishop of Santiago de Cuba and consecrated bishop in 1562. On April 28, 1564, he was appointed during the papacy of Pope Pius IV as Bishop of Santiago de Guatemala where he served until his death in August 1569.

== External links and additional sources ==
- Cheney, David M. "Archdiocese of Santiago de Cuba". Catholic-Hierarchy.org. (for Chronology of Bishops) ^{[self-published]}
- Chow, Gabriel. "Metropolitan Archdiocese of Santiago". GCatholic.org. (for Chronology of Bishops) ^{[self-published]}
- Cheney, David M. "Archdiocese of Guatemala". Catholic-Hierarchy.org. (for Chronology of Bishops) ^{[self-published]}
- Chow, Gabriel. "Metropolitan Archdiocese of Santiago de Guatemala". GCatholic.org. (for Chronology of Bishops) ^{[self-published]}

Catholic Church titles
Preceded by Fernando de Uranga	Bishop of Santiago de Cuba; 1561–1664	Succeeded by Juan del Castillo
Preceded by Francisco Marroquín Hurtado	Bishop of Santiago de Guatemala; 1564–1569	Succeeded by Pedro Gómez de Córdoba
