= Juan de Escalante Turcios y Mendoza =

Spanish Roman Catholic prelate

Most Reverend Juan de Escalante Turcios y Mendoza
- Archbishop (Personal Title) of Yucatán
- Church: Catholic Church
- In office: 1679–1681
- Predecessor: Luís de Cifuentes y Sotomayor
- Successor: Juan Cano Sandoval
- Previous post: Archbishop of Santo Domingo (1672–1679)

Orders
- Consecration: 1673 by Luís de Cifuentes y Sotomayor

Personal details
- Born: 1608 Andalucía, Spain
- Died: 31 May 1681 (aged 72–73) Mérida, Yucatán, Mexico

Juan de Escalante Turcios y Mendoza (1608 – 31 May 1681) was a Roman Catholic prelate who served as Archbishop (Personal Title) of Yucatán (1679–1681) and Archbishop of Santo Domingo (1672–1679).

== Biography ==
Juan de Escalante Turcios y Mendoza was born in Andalucía, Spain in 1608. On 23 October 1672, he was selected by the King of Spain and confirmed by Pope Clement X as Archbishop of Santo Domingo. In 1673, he was consecrated bishop by Luís de Cifuentes y Sotomayor, Bishop of Yucatán. On 29 December 1679, he was selected by the King of Spain and confirmed by Pope Innocent XI as Archbishop (Personal Title) of Yucatán. He served as Bishop of Yucatán until his death on 31 May 1681.

== External links and additional sources ==
- Cheney, David M. "Archdiocese of Yucatán". Catholic-Hierarchy.org. (for Chronology of Bishops) ^{[self-published]}
- Chow, Gabriel. "Metropolitan Archdiocese of Yucatán". GCatholic.org. (for Chronology of Bishops) ^{[self-published]}
- Cheney, David M. "Archdiocese of Santo Domingo". Catholic-Hierarchy.org. (for Chronology of Bishops) ^{[self-published]}
- Chow, Gabriel. "Metropolitan Archdiocese of Santo Domingo". GCatholic.org. (for Chronology of Bishops) ^{[self-published]}

Catholic Church titles
Preceded by Francisco de la Cueva Maldonado	Archbishop of Santo Domingo; 1672–1679	Succeeded by Domingo Fernández Navarrete
Preceded by Luís de Cifuentes y Sotomayor	Archbishop (Personal Title) of Yucatán; 1679–1681	Succeeded by Juan Cano Sandoval
