= Juan Ortega y Montañés =

Mexican politician

Don Juan Ortega y Montañés
- Archbishop of México
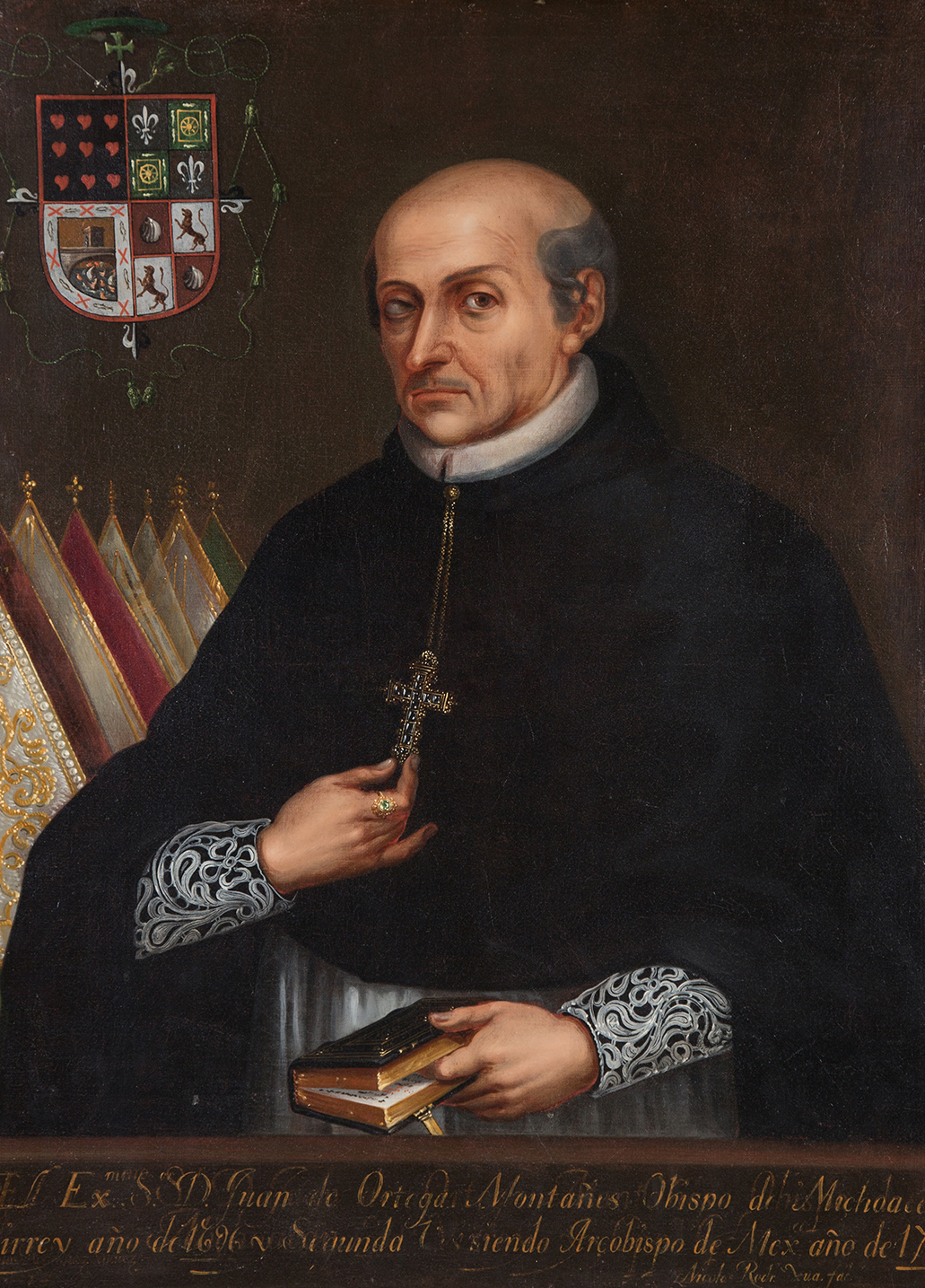
- Archbishop Juan Ortega y Montañés, Viceroy of New Spain
- Church: Catholic Church
- Archdiocese: Archdiocese of Mexico
- In office: 21 June 1700 – 16 December 1708
- Predecessor: Francisco de Aguiar y Seijas
- Successor: José Pérez de Lanciego Eguiluz y Mirafuentes
- Previous posts: Bishop of Michoacán (1682-1700); Bishop of Santiago de Guatemala (1675-1682); Bishop of Durango (1674-1675)

Orders
- Consecration: 24 March 1675 by Payo Enríquez de Rivera

Personal details
- Born: Juan de Ortega Cano Montañez y Patiño; 3 July 1627 Kingdom of Murcia, Crown of Castile
- Died: 16 December 1708 (aged 81)

Don Juan Ortega y Montañés (also Juan de Ortega Cano Montañez y Patiño) (July 3, 1627 in Siles, Spain – December 16, 1708 in Mexico City) was a Roman Catholic bishop and colonial administrator in Guatemala and New Spain. He was successively bishop of Durango (1670 to 1681), of Guatemala (1681 to 1684) and of Michoacán (1684 to March 24, 1700), and then archbishop of Mexico (June 21, 1700 to December 16, 1708). He also served as interim viceroy of New Spain from February 27, 1696, to December 18, 1696, and again from November 4, 1701, to November 27, 1702.

== Education and ecclesiastical career ==
Ortega y Montañés was a native of Cartagena. Some sources give a different birth date: June 23, 1627. He studied at Cartagena, at Málaga, and at Alcalá de Henares, where he graduated with a doctorate in jurisprudence. He was named inquisitor for New Spain, and it was there that he entered the service of the Church. He was bishop of Durango, then Guatemala, then Michoacán (Valladolid). He was known for his opposition to clerical abuse and arbitrariness, and also for his support of simple happiness and poverty among the clergy. He had also a reputation for charity, concern for the parishioners, and energy in his work.

== First term as viceroy ==
In February 1696 he was named interim viceroy of New Spain, to succeed Gaspar de la Cerda, 8th Count of Galve.

One of the first challenges of his administration was the suppression of an uprising of university students. On March 27, 1696, they tried to burn the scaffold in the Plaza de Armas, which they saw as "an annoying manifestation of the power of the monarchy." This caused great alarm in Mexico City. The constables broke up the demonstration, arresting a youth named Francisco González de Castro. The students tried to rescue him as he was being escorted to jail, pelting the constables with rocks.

The other important event of this viceroy's first term was the sending of a Jesuit expedition to evangelize and colonize the Californias. This expedition included the famous missionary fathers Eusebio Kino and Juan María Salvatierra. The two fathers had founded the Fondo Piadoso de California on August 15, 1696, to continue the work of colonization.

A new viceroy, José Sarmiento y Valladares, conde de Moctezuma y de Tula, took up the government on December 13, 1696, and Bishop Ortega y Montañés returned to his see in Michoacán. He remained there until March, 1700, when he was made archbishop of Mexico.

== Second term as viceroy ==
A ship arrived in Veracruz on March 6, 1701, carrying the news of the death of King Charles II of Spain on November 1 of the previous year. Charles II left no heir. The War of the Spanish Succession, between Spain and France on the one hand and Austria, England and Holland on the other, began to determine his successor. The viceroy at the time, Sarmiento y Valladares, was a supporter of the Habsburg claims to the Spanish throne. (The Bourbons were in control in Spain.) He was removed from office and Ortega was once again named interim viceroy.

Ortega y Montañés's formal consecration as archbishop of Mexico occurred January 6, 1702, while he was again serving as viceroy. The archbishop was distinguished for his devotion to the Virgin of Guadalupe, patron of Mexico, whose church was finished under this administration (1702). The archbishop personally toured, asking for alms to support the construction.

He suspended the transportation of prisoners from New Spain to Puerto Rico, which his predecessor Sarmiento y Valladares had begun.

The viceroy received word that the conde de Chateau-Renaud had arrived in Havana with a French fleet to transport the tribute of New Spain to France. Viceroy Ortega consulted with the Audiencia, and the decision was reached not to turn over the tribute to the French without express orders from the Spanish Crown.

On November 18, 1702, Archbishop Ortega left Mexico City for Otumba to welcome the new viceroy, Francisco Fernández de la Cueva, 10th Duke of Alburquerque, and turn over temporal power to him.

Ortega died in 1708, still occupying the see of Mexico. He left behind various writings. These included Informe del Estado de la Nueva España, written for his first successor, José Sarmiento y Valladares. It was a report on the state of the colony at the end of the seventeenth century.

== External links and additional sources ==
- Cheney, David M. "Archdiocese of Durango". Catholic-Hierarchy.org. (for Chronology of Bishops) ^{[self-published]}
- Chow, Gabriel. "Archdiocese of Durango (Mexico)". GCatholic.org. (for Chronology of Bishops) ^{[self-published]}
- Cheney, David M. "Archdiocese of Guatemala". Catholic-Hierarchy.org. (for Chronology of Bishops) ^{[self-published]}
- Chow, Gabriel. "Metropolitan Archdiocese of Santiago de Guatemala". GCatholic.org. (for Chronology of Bishops) ^{[self-published]}
- Cheney, David M. "Archdiocese of Morelia". Catholic-Hierarchy.org. (for Chronology of Bishops) ^{[self-published]}
- Chow, Gabriel. "Metropolitan Archdiocese of Morelia (Mexico)". GCatholic.org. (for Chronology of Bishops) ^{[self-published]}

Government offices
Preceded by The Count of Galve	Viceroy of New Spain; 1696	Succeeded by The Count of Moctezuma and Tula
Preceded by The Count of Moctezuma and Tula	Viceroy of New Spain; 1701–1702	Succeeded by The Duke of Alburquerque
Religious titles
Preceded by Juan Aguirre y Gorozpe	Bishop of Durango; 1670–1681	Succeeded by Bartolomé Garcia de Escañuela
Preceded by Juan de Sancto Mathía Sáenz de Mañozca y Murillo	Bishop of Guatemala; 1681–1684	Succeeded by Andrés de las Navas y Quevedo
Preceded by Antonio de Monroy	Bishop of Michoacán; 1684–1700	Succeeded by García Felipe de Legazpi y Velasco Altamirano y Albornoz
Preceded by Francisco de Aguiar y Seijas	Archbishop of Mexico; 1700–1708	Succeeded by José Pérez de Lanciego Eguiluz y Mirafuentes
