= Diego Álvarez de Osorio =

Nicaraguan prelate (1485–1536)

Most Reverend Diego Álvarez de Osorio
- Bishop Elect of Nicaragua
- Church: Catholic Church
- Diocese: Diocese of Nicaragua
- In office: 1531–1536
- Predecessor: None
- Successor: Francisco de Mendavia

Personal details
- Born: 1485
- Died: May 1536 (age 51) León, Nicaragua

Diego Álvarez de Osorio (1485 – May 1536) was a Roman Catholic prelate who served as the first Bishop of Nicaragua (1531–1536).

== Biography ==
Records indicate that Diego Álvarez de Osorio was born in Darien, Panama in 1485; although this is believed unlikely. Other sources indicate that he arrived in Panama in 1528 where he served as canon of the cathedral. On 26 Feb 1531, he was appointed during the papacy of Pope Clement VII as Bishop of Nicaragua. Although he was never consecrated bishop, he served as Bishop Elect of Nicaragua until his death in May 1536.

== External links and additional sources ==
- Cheney, David M. "Diocese of León en Nicaragua". Catholic-Hierarchy.org. (for Chronology of Bishops) ^{[self-published]}
- Chow, Gabriel. "Diocese of León (Nicaragua)". GCatholic.org. (for Chronology of Bishops) ^{[self-published]}

Catholic Church titles
Preceded by None	Bishop Elect of Nicaragua; 1531–1536	Succeeded by Francisco de Mendavia
