= Juan Ramírez de Arellano (bishop) =

Most Reverend Juan Ramírez de Arellano
- Bishop of Santiago de Guatemala
- Church: Catholic Church
- Diocese: Diocese of Santiago de Guatemala
- In office: 1600–1609
- Predecessor: Pedro Gómez de Córdoba
- Successor: Juan de las Cabezas Altamirano

Orders
- Consecration: 25 July 1600 by Domenico Ginnasi

Personal details
- Died: 24 March 1609 Guatemala

Juan Ramírez de Arellano, O.P. (died 24 March 1609, in San Salvador, El Salvador) was a Roman Catholic prelate who served as Bishop of Santiago de Guatemala (1600–1609).

== Biography ==
Juan Ramírez de Arellano was ordained a priest in the Order of Preachers. On 12 May 1600, he was appointed during the papacy of Pope Clement VIII as Bishop of Santiago de Guatemala. On 25 July 1600, he was consecrated bishop by Domenico Ginnasi, Archbishop of Manfredonia, with Juan Pedro González de Mendoza, Bishop Emeritus of Lipari, and Martín Vasquez de Arce, Bishop of Puerto Rico, serving as co-consecrators. He served as Bishop of Santiago de Guatemala until his death on 24 March 1609.

Catholic Church titles
Preceded by Pedro Gómez de Córdoba	Bishop of Santiago de Guatemala; 1600–1609	Succeeded by Juan de las Cabezas Altamirano
