= Juan de las Cabezas Altamirano =

17th century Roman Catholic prelate

Most Reverend Juan de las Cabezas Altamirano
- Bishop of Arequipa
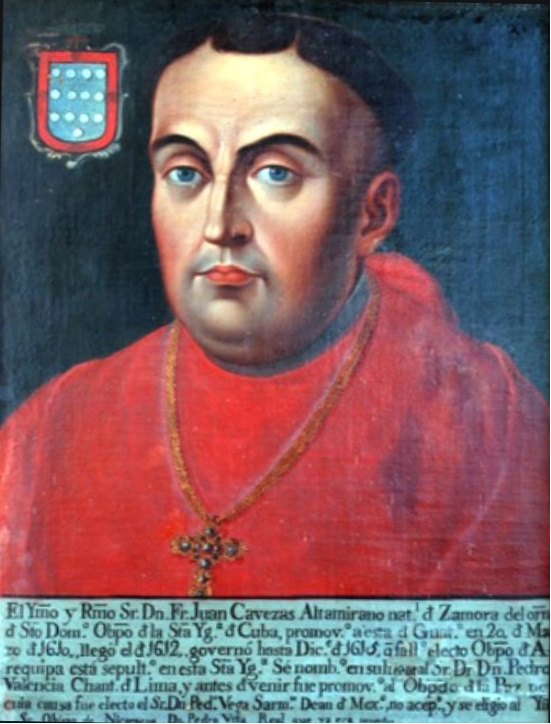
- Church: Catholic Church
- Diocese: Diocese of Arequipa
- In office: 1615
- Predecessor: Cristóbal Rodríguez Juárez
- Successor: Pedro de Perea
- Previous posts: Bishop of Santiago de Cuba (1602–1610); Bishop of Santiago de Guatemala (1610–1615)

Personal details
- Born: Zamora, Spain
- Died: 19 December 1615 (age 50) Arequipa, Peru

Juan de las Cabezas Altamirano (1565 – 19 December 1615) was a Roman Catholic prelate who served as Bishop of Arequipa (1615), Bishop of Santiago de Guatemala (1610–1615), and Bishop of Santiago de Cuba (1602–1610).

== Biography ==
Juan de las Cabezas Altamirano was born in Zamora, Spain in 1565. On 15 April 1602, he was appointed during the papacy of Pope Clement VIII as Bishop of Santiago de Cuba. On 19 July 1610, he was appointed during the papacy of Pope Paul V as Bishop of Santiago de Guatemala. On 16 September 1615, he was appointed during the papacy of Pope Paul V as Bishop of Arequipa. He served as Bishop of Arequipa until his death on 19 December 1615. While bishop, he was the principal consecrator of Alfonso del Galdo, Bishop of Comayagua (1613).

== External links and additional sources ==
- Cheney, David M. "Archdiocese of Santiago de Cuba". Catholic-Hierarchy.org. (for Chronology of Bishops) ^{[self-published]}
- Chow, Gabriel. "Metropolitan Archdiocese of Santiago". GCatholic.org. (for Chronology of Bishops) ^{[self-published]}
- Cheney, David M. "Archdiocese of Guatemala". Catholic-Hierarchy.org. (for Chronology of Bishops) ^{[self-published]}
- Chow, Gabriel. "Metropolitan Archdiocese of Santiago de Guatemala". GCatholic.org. (for Chronology of Bishops) ^{[self-published]}
- Cheney, David M. "Archdiocese of Arequipa". Catholic-Hierarchy.org. (for Chronology of Bishops) ^{[self-published]}
- Chow, Gabriel. "Metropolitan Archdiocese of Arequipa". GCatholic.org. (for Chronology of Bishops) ^{[self-published]}

Catholic Church titles
Preceded by Bartolomé de la Plaza	Bishop of Santiago de Cuba; 1602–1610	Succeeded by Alonso Orozco Enriquez de Armendáriz Castellanos y Toledo
Preceded by Juan Ramírez de Arellano (bishop)	Bishop of Santiago de Guatemala; 1610–1615	Succeeded by Pedro de Valencia
Preceded by Cristóbal Rodríguez Juárez	Bishop of Arequipa; 1615	Succeeded by Pedro de Perea
