= Custodio do Pinho =

Most Reverend Custodio do Pinho
- Titular Bishop of Hierapolis in Isauria; Vicar Apostolic of Malabar
- Church: Catholic Church
- Archdiocese: Apostolic Vicariate of Malabar
- In office: 1694–1697
- Predecessor: Raphael de Figueredo
- Successor: Angelo Vigliotti
- Previous posts: Vicar Apostolic of Great Mogul (1669–1696); Vicar Apostolic of Malabar (1694–1697)

Personal details
- Born: 3 August 1638 Salsette, Kingdom of Portugal
- Died: 14 April 1697 (age 58) Malabar, India

Custodio do Pinho (1638–1697) was a Roman Catholic prelate who served as Titular Bishop of Hierapolis in Isauria (1669–1697), Vicar Apostolic of Malabar (1694–1697), and Vicar Apostolic of Great Mogul (1669–1696).

== Biography ==
Custodio do Pinho was born in Salsette, Kingdom of Portugal on 3 August 1638. On 14 January 1669, he was appointed during the papacy of Pope Clement IX as Vicar Apostolic of Great Mogul and Titular Bishop of Hierapolis in Isauria. On 27 January 1669, he was consecrated bishop. On 16 January 1694, he was appointed during the papacy of Pope Innocent XII as Vicar Apostolic of Malabar. In 1696, he resigned as Vicar Apostolic of Great Mogul. He served as Vicar Apostolic of Malabar until his death on 14 April 1697.

== External links and additional sources ==
- Cheney, David M. "Hierapolis in Isauria (Titular See)". Catholic-Hierarchy.org. (for Chronology of Bishops) ^{[self-published]}
- Chow, Gabriel. "Titular Episcopal See of Hieropolis (Turkey)". GCatholic.org. (for Chronology of Bishops) ^{[self-published]}
- Cheney, David M. "Archdiocese of Bombay". Catholic-Hierarchy.org. (for Chronology of Bishops) ^{[self-published]}
- Chow, Gabriel. "Metropolitan Archdiocese of Bombay (India)". GCatholic.org. (for Chronology of Bishops) ^{[self-published]}

Catholic Church titles
Preceded by Matthieu de Castro Malo	Vicar Apostolic of Great Mogul; 1669–1696	Succeeded by Fernand Palma d'Artois
Preceded by Raphael de Figueredo	Vicar Apostolic of Malabar; 1694–1697	Succeeded by Angelo Vigliotti
Preceded by Johann Heinrich von Anethan	Titular Bishop of Hierapolis in Isauria; 1669–1697	Succeeded by Konstantyn Józef Zieliński
