= Fernando González de Bariodero =

Roman Catholic bishop of Nicaragua

Most Reverend Fernando González de Bariodero
- Bishop of Nicaragua
- Church: Catholic Church
- Diocese: Diocese of Nicaragua
- In office: 1556
- Predecessor: Antonio de Valdivieso
- Successor: Lázaro Carrasco

Orders
- Consecration: 2 May 1556

Personal details
- Died: 26 February 1549 León, Nicaragua

Fernando González de Bariodero was a Roman Catholic prelate who served as Bishop of Nicaragua (1556).

== Biography ==
On 29 February 1544, Fernando González de Bariodero was appointed during the papacy of Paul III as Bishop of Nicaragua. On 2 May 1556, he was consecrated bishop. It is unlikely that he took possession of the diocese as a Vicar Capitular, Father Juan Alvarez (1555–1557) continued to serve despite his appointment. His eventual replacement, Lázaro Carrasco, was appointed in 1556 and took possession in 1557.

== External links and additional sources ==
- Cheney, David M. "Diocese of León en Nicaragua". Catholic-Hierarchy.org. (for Chronology of Bishops) ^{[self-published]}
- Chow, Gabriel. "Diocese of León (Nicaragua)". GCatholic.org. (for Chronology of Bishops) ^{[self-published]}

Catholic Church titles
Preceded by Antonio de Valdivieso	Bishop of Nicaragua; 1556	Succeeded by Lázaro Carrasco
