= Dionisio Zannettini =

Most Reverend Dionisio Zannettini
- Bishop of Mylopotamos
- Church: Catholic Church
- Diocese: Roman Catholic Diocese of Mylopotamus
- In office: 1538–1555
- Predecessor: Vincenzo de Massari
- Successor: Giacomo Surreto
- Previous post: Bishop of Ceos and Thermia (1529-1538)

Personal details
- Died: 1566

Dionisio Zannettini (died 1566) was a Roman Catholic prelate who served as Bishop of Mylopotamos (1538–1555) and Bishop of Ceos and Thermia (1529–1538).

== Biography ==
Dionisio Zannettini was ordained a priest in the Order of Friars Minor. On 8 Feb 1529, he was appointed during the papacy of Pope Clement VII as Bishop of Ceos and Thermia. On 11 Dec 1538, he was appointed during the papacy of Pope Paul III as Bishop of Mylopotamos. He served as Bishop of Mylopotamos until his resignation in 1555. He died in 1566. While bishop, he was the principal co-consecrator of Alfonso Oliva, Bishop of Bovino (1535) and François Maronus (1535).

== External links and additional sources ==
- Cheney, David M. "Diocese of Mylopotamos". Catholic-Hierarchy.org. (for Chronology of Bishops) ^{[self-published]}
- Chow, Gabriel. "Titular Episcopal See of Eleutherna". GCatholic.org. (for Chronology of Bishops) ^{[self-published]}

Catholic Church titles
Preceded by Giovanni Zotto	Bishop of Ceos and Thermia; 1529–1538	Succeeded by Costantino Giustianiani
Preceded by Vincenzo de Massari	Bishop of Mylopotamos; 1538–1555	Succeeded by Giacomo Surreto
