= Juan Antonio Diaz de Salcedo =

Most Reverend Juan Antonio Diaz de Salcedo
- Bishop of Nicaragua
- Church: Catholic Church
- Diocese: Diocese of Nicaragua
- In office: 1597–1603
- Predecessor: Alfonso de la Mota y Escobar
- Successor: Pedro de Villarreal
- Previous post: Bishop of Santiago de Cuba (1580–1597)

Personal details
- Born: Burgos, Spain
- Died: 1603 León, Nicaragua

Juan Antonio Diaz de Salcedo, O.F.M. (died 1603) was a Roman Catholic prelate who served as Bishop of Nicaragua (1597–1603) and Bishop of Santiago de Cuba (1580–1597).

== Biography ==
Juan Antonio Diaz de Salcedo was born in Burgos, Spain and ordained a priest in the Order of Friars Minor. On 14 March 1580, he was appointed during the papacy of Pope Gregory XIII as Bishop of Santiago de Cuba. On 28 July 1597, he was appointed during the papacy of Pope Clement VIII as Bishop of Nicaragua. He served as Bishop of Nicaragua until his death in 1603.

== External links and additional sources ==
- Cheney, David M. "Archdiocese of Santiago de Cuba". Catholic-Hierarchy.org. (for Chronology of Bishops) ^{[self-published]}
- Chow, Gabriel. "Metropolitan Archdiocese of Santiago". GCatholic.org. (for Chronology of Bishops) ^{[self-published]}
- Cheney, David M. "Diocese of León en Nicaragua". Catholic-Hierarchy.org. (for Chronology of Bishops) ^{[self-published]}
- Chow, Gabriel. "Diocese of León (Nicaragua)". GCatholic.org. (for Chronology of Bishops) ^{[self-published]}

Catholic Church titles
| Preceded by Juan del Castillo | Bishop of Santiago de Cuba; 1580–1597 | Succeeded by Bartolomé de la Plaza |
| Preceded by Alfonso de la Mota y Escobar | Bishop of Nicaragua; 1597–1603 | Succeeded by Pedro de Villarreal |
