= Tomás Manso =

Most Reverend Tomás Manso
- Bishop of Nicaragua
- Church: Catholic Church
- Diocese: Diocese of Nicaragua
- In office: 1658–1659
- Predecessor: Alonso de Briceño
- Successor: Juan de la Torre y Castro
- Previous post: New Mexico

Personal details
- Born: Luarca, Spain
- Died: 1659 Granada, Nicaragua

Tomás Manso (c. 1604 – 1659) was a Roman Catholic priest who worked in New Mexico as a missionary from 1629 until 1656 and served as Bishop of Nicaragua in 1658 and 1659. Tomás Manso was the older half-brother of Juan Manso de Contreras who was the governor of New Mexico from 1656 to 1659.

== Biography ==
Tomás Manso was born in Santa Eulalia de Luarca, Spain, about 1604. His father was Sebastián Manso and his mother was Maria Méndez. He may have been of noble ancestry. Manso professed as a member of the Order of Friars Minor of the Franciscans on 12 July 1624.

In 1629, Manso arrived in New Mexico as a Franciscan missionary to the American Indians, especially to the town-dwelling Puebloan people inhabiting the Rio Grande valley. In 1631, Manso became the "procurador general" in charge of the supply service to the Franciscan missions in New Mexico. Manso organized and led the mule-drawn caravans which left Mexico City every three years and followed the Camino Real de Tierra Adentro (Royal Road of the Interior) for 1,600 miles (2,600 km) to the Spanish colony of New Mexico. The caravans were the lifeline of the isolated New Mexican settlement. Manso served as procurador general for 25 years, making nine round trips between Mexico City and New Mexico. During his time with the supply service, Manso was in business in Mexico, whether for his benefit or that of the Franciscans is uncertain. He sold clothing manufactured in New Mexico and livestock which accompanied the caravans. In 1641, Manso journeyed back to Spain to settle the affairs of a closed Franciscan mission in Puebla, Mexico, returning to Mexico by 1644.

On 14 December 1656, Manso was selected by the king of Spain as Bishop of Nicaragua and confirmed on 29 April 1658 by Pope Alexander VII. In 1659, six months after his arrival in Nicaragua, he died in the city of Granada.

== External links and additional sources ==
- Cheney, David M. "Diocese of León en Nicaragua". Catholic-Hierarchy.org. (for Chronology of Bishops) ^{[self-published]}
- Chow, Gabriel. "Diocese of León (Nicaragua)". GCatholic.org. (for Chronology of Bishops) ^{[self-published]}

Catholic Church titles
Preceded by Alonso de Briceño	Bishop of Nicaragua; 1658–1659	Succeeded by Juan de la Torre y Castro
