= Juan del Castillo (bishop) =

Bishop of Santiago de Cuba (1564-1578)

Most Reverend Juan del Castillo
- Bishop of Santiago de Cuba
- Church: Catholic Church
- Archdiocese: Diocese of Santiago de Cuba
- In office: 1564–1578
- Predecessor: Bernardino de Villalpando
- Successor: Juan Antonio Diaz de Salcedo

Orders
- Consecration: June 1567

Personal details
- Born: Quintanar de la Orden, Spain
- Died: June 1593

Juan del Castillo (died 1593) was a Roman Catholic prelate who served as Bishop of Santiago de Cuba (1564–1578).

== Biography ==
Juan del Castillo was born in Quintanar de la Orden, Spain. On 28 April 1564, Juan del Castillo was appointed during the papacy of Pope Pius IV as Bishop of Santiago de Cuba. In June 1567, he was consecrated bishop. He served as Bishop of Santiago de Cuba until his resignation on 3 October 1578. He died in June 1593.

== External links and additional sources ==
- Cheney, David M. "Archdiocese of Santiago de Cuba". Catholic-Hierarchy.org. (for Chronology of Bishops) ^{[self-published]}
- Chow, Gabriel. "Metropolitan Archdiocese of Santiago". GCatholic.org. (for Chronology of Bishops) ^{[self-published]}

Catholic Church titles
Preceded by Bernardino de Villalpando	Bishop of Santiago de Cuba; 1564–1578	Succeeded by Juan Antonio Diaz de Salcedo
