= Roman Catholic Diocese of Termia =

The Diocese of Termia or Diocese of Thermae or Diocese of Thermia (Latin: Dioecesis Thermiensis seu Firminiensis) was a Latin Catholic crusader bishopric located in the Cyclades archipelago in the Aegean Sea. It was originally established as the Diocese of Ceo in 1330, before being renamed in 1600. The diocese was reestablished as a titular see in 1933 under the name Titular Episcopal See of Cea.

== History ==
The diocese in the Cyclades was first established in 1330 as the Diocese of Ceo, part of the Venetian Duchy of Naxos, on the island of Kea. In 1600, the bishopric was moved from Kea to Kythnos, and the diocese was renamed the Diocese of Thermia. Ordinaries of the diocese observed Roman Rite.

In 1650, the Cyclades were conquered by the Ottoman Empire and the diocese's activities were suppressed. The diocese was nominally restored as the Titular Episcopal See of Cea in 1933, and remains listed as such today.

=== Ordinaries ===
==== Suffragan Bishops of Ceo ====
- Nicolò (? – ?)
- Pietro, Dominican Order (O.P.) (1350.11.17 – ?)
- Princivalle, Friars Minor (O.F.M.) (1370.05.29 – ?)
- Simone da Arezzo, O.F.M. (1376.06.16 – ?)
- Giorgio (? – ?)
- Francesco da Venezia, O.F.M. (1422.07.06 – ?)
- Francesco Barberi (1435? – death 1445?)
- Francesco, O.F.M. (1445.06.09 – 1453.04.30), later Bishop of Naxos (Greek island) (1453.04.30 – ?)
- Giovanni di Sicilia, O.F.M. (1454.11.29 – ?)
- Nicolò (? – ?)
- Pietro (? – ?)
- Gómez (1498.05.24 – ?)
- Giorgio Barozzi (? – ?)
- Giovanni Zotto (1520.02.06 – ?)
- Dionisio Zannettini, O.F.M. (1529.02.08 – 1538.12.11), later Bishop of Milopotamus (also in Greece; 1538.12.11 – 1555)
- Costantino Giustianiani, O.P. (1540.08.27 – death 1546)
- Giovanni de Gaona, Canons Regular of saint Augustine (C.R.S.A.) (1546.02.19 – ?)
- Giacomo Rocca (1550? – ?)

==== Suffragan Bishops of Termia ====
Metropolitan: Archdiocese of Naxos

- Petrus Pitarca, O.F.M. (26 Jun 1617 - 1622 Died)
- Cristóforo Chrisostome Carletti, O.F.M. (23 May 1622 - 1634 Resigned)
- Giacomo Della Rocca (25 Sep 1634 - 1644 Died)
- Giovanni Camponeschi, O.F.M. (19 Dec 1644 - 22 Jun 1654 Confirmed, Bishop of Mottola)

==== Latin Catholic titular see of Cea ====
Since the diocese's nominal restoration in 1933, under the name Cea, it has had the following incumbents, so far of the fitting Episcopal (lowest) rank, but is vacant since decades:

- James Thomas O’Dowd (1948.05.22 – 1950.02.05)
- José Clemente Maurer, Redemptorists (C.SS.R.) (1950.03.01 – 1951.10.27), as Auxiliary Bishop of La Paz (Bolivia) (1950.03.01 – 1951.10.27), later Metropolitan Archbishop of Sucre (Bolivia) (1951.10.27 – 1983.11.30), created Cardinal-Priest of SS. Redentore e S. Alfonso in Via Merulana (1967.06.29 – 1990.06.27), President of Episcopal Conference of Bolivia (1968 – 1979)
- Father Wesceslau Nazareno Ponte de Spoleto, Capuchin Friars (O.F.M. Cap.) (1952.04.26 – 1952.06.29)
- Lawrence Bernard Brennan Casey (1953.02.10 – 1966.03.04).

== See also ==
- List of Catholic dioceses in Greece
