= Diocese of León in Nicaragua =

Roman Catholic diocese in Nicaragua

Coordinates: 12.4350°N 86.8785°W

Diocese of León in Nicaragua Dioecesis Leonensis in Nicaragua Diócesis de León
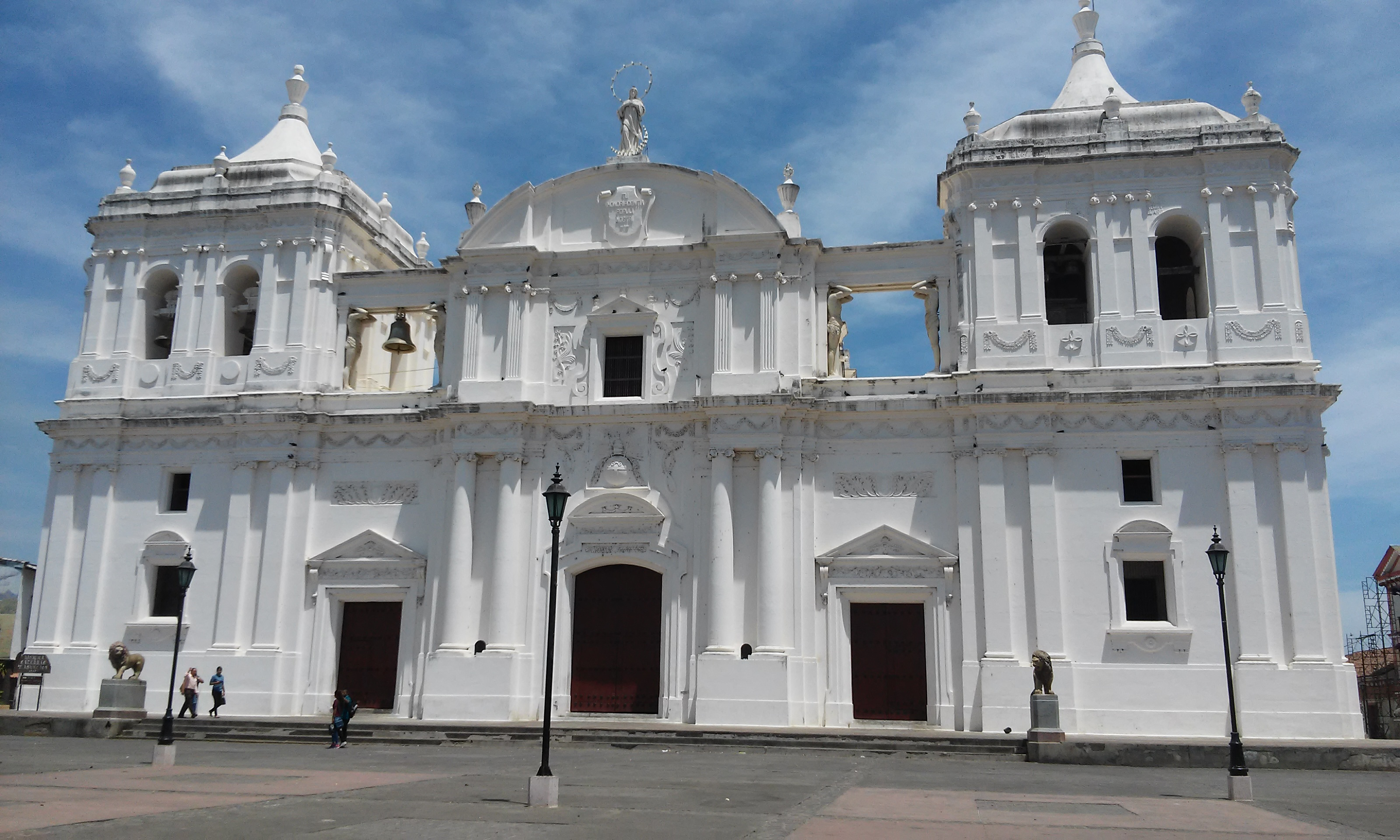
- Catedral Basílica de la Asunción

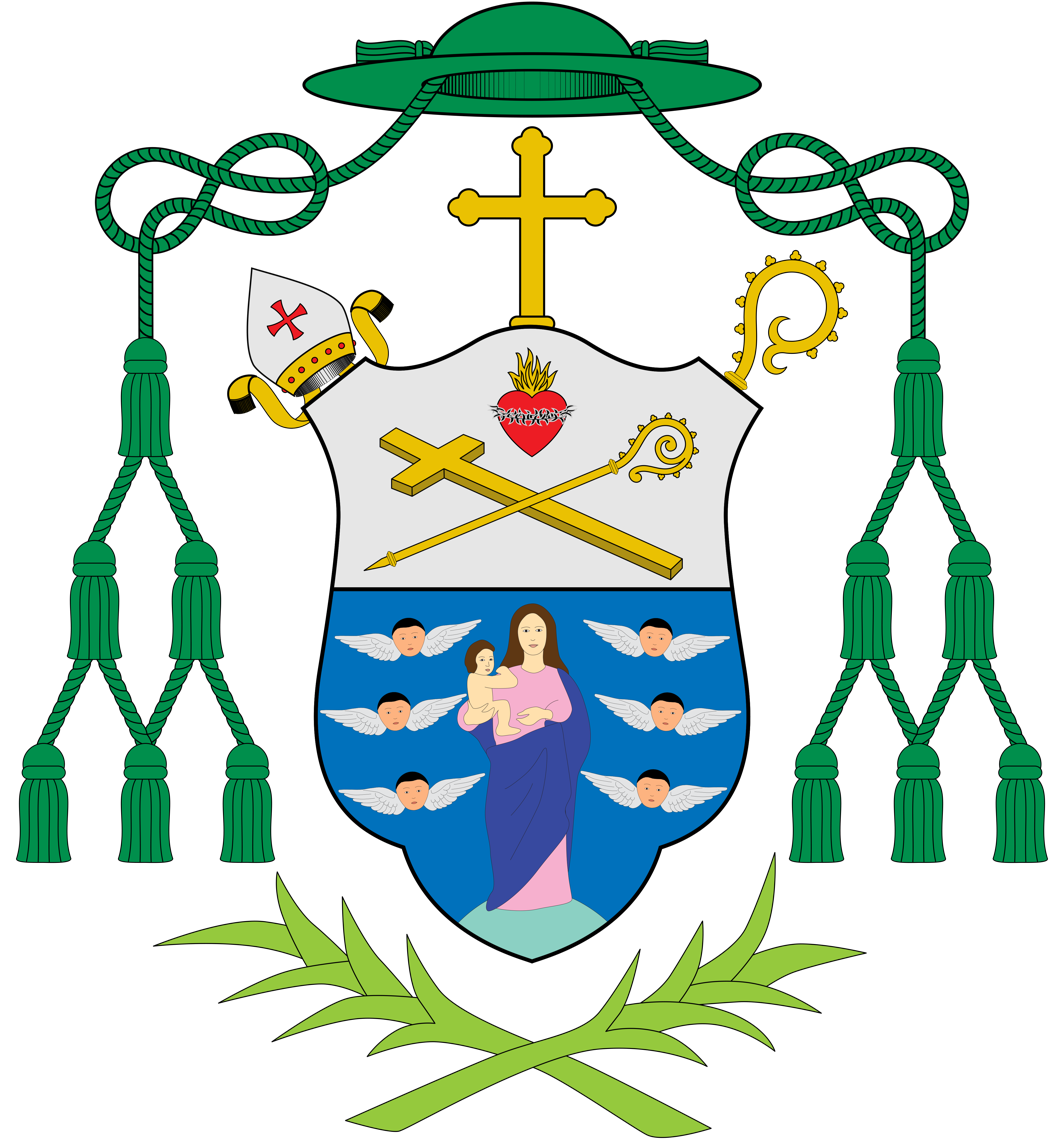
- Coat of arms

Location
- Country: Nicaragua
- Ecclesiastical province: Province of Managua
- Metropolitan: Managua

Statistics
- Area: 10,279 km^{2} (3,969 sq mi)
- Population: Total; Catholics: (as of 2022); 903,425; 820,120 (90.8%)
- Parishes: 63

Information
- Denomination: Roman Catholic
- Rite: Roman Rite
- Established: 3 November 1534 (491 years ago)
- Cathedral: Catedral Basílica de la Asunción

Current leadership
- Pope: Leo XIV
- Bishop: Sócrates René Sandigo Jirón
- Metropolitan Archbishop: Leopoldo Brenes

Map
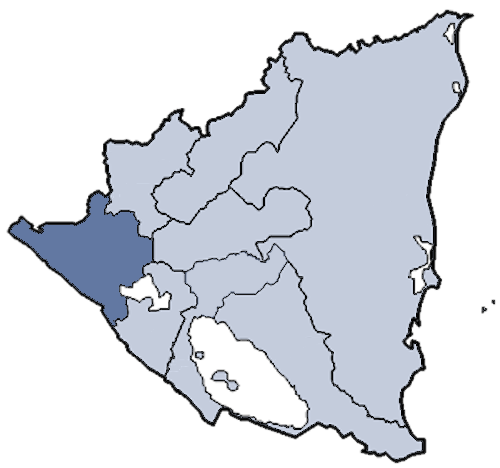

There is also a Diocese of Nicaragua (and a Bishop of Nicaragua) in the Anglican Church in Central America.

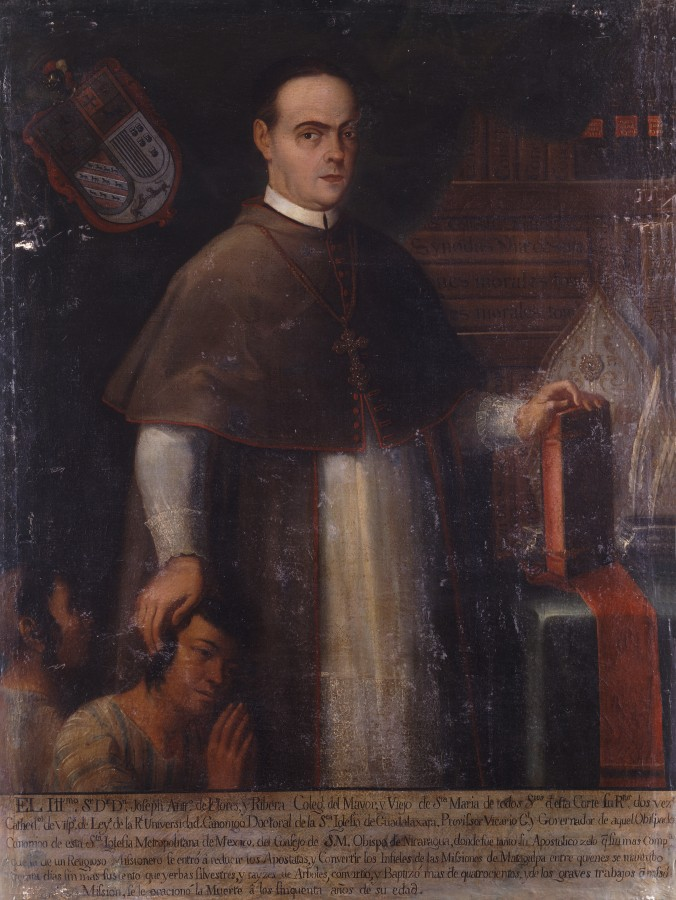
José Antonio de Flores y Ribera, bishop of Nicaragua between 1753 and 1756.

The Roman Catholic Diocese of León in Nicaragua (erected 3 November 1534) is a suffragan of the Archdiocese of Managua.

== Bishops ==
Diocese of Nicaragua
Erected November 3, 1534

- Diego Álvarez de Osorio (1531–1536 Died)
- Francisco de Mendavia (1537–1540 Died)
- Antonio de Valdivieso (1544–1549 Died)

Vicar Capitular, Father Martin Hernández de Herrera (1550–1555)

- Fernando González de Bariodero (1555– )

Vicar Capitular, Father Juan Alvarez (1555–1557)

- Lázaro Carrasco (1557–1562 Died)
- Luís de la Fuente (bishop) (1564–1566 Died)
- Pedro Gómez de Córdoba (1568–1574 Appointed, Bishop of Santiago de Guatemala)
- Antonio de Zayas (bishop) (1575–1582 Resigned)
- Domingo de Ulloa (1585–1591 Appointed, Bishop of Popayán)
- Jerónimo de Escobar (1592–1593 Died)
- Alfonso de la Mota y Escobar (1594–1595 Resigned as Bishop Elect)
- Juan Antonio Diaz de Salcedo (1597–1603 Died)
- Pedro de Villarreal (1603–1619 Died)
- Benito Rodríguez Valtodano (1621–1629 Died)
- Agustin de Hinojosa y Montalvo (1630–1631 Died)
- Juan Barahona Zapata del Águila (1632–1632 Died)
- Fernando Núñez Sagredo (1633–1639 Died)
- Miguel de Poblete Casasola (1640 Resigned and later appointed Archbishop of Manila)
- Alonso de Briceño (Brizeño) (1644–1653 Appointed, Bishop of Caracas, Santiago de Venezuela)
- Tomás Manso (1658–1659 Died)
- Juan de la Torre y Castro (1661–1662 Died)
- Alfonso Bravo de Laguna (1670–1674 Died) Vicar Capitular from 1660
- Andrés de las Navas y Quevedo (1677–1683 Confirmed, Bishop of Santiago de Guatemala)
- Juan de Rojas y Asúa (1683–1685 Died)
- Nicolás Delgado (1687–1698 Died)
- Diego Morcillo Rubio de Suñón de Robledo (1701–1708 Appointed, Bishop of La Paz)
- Juan Benito Garret y Arlovi (1708–1716 Died)
- Andrés Quiles Galindo (1718–1719 Died)
- José Xirón de Alvarado (1721–1724 Died)
- Francisco Dionisio de Villavicencio (1726–1735 Died)
- Domingo Antonio de Zatarain (1738–1741 Died)
- Isidoro Marín Bullón y Figueroa (1743–1748 Died)
- Pedro Agustín Morell de Santa Cruz y Lora (1749–1753 Confirmed, Bishop of Santiago de Cuba)
- José Antonio Flores de Rivera (1753–1756 Died)
- Matías José de Navia Bolaños y Moscoso (1757–1762 Died)
- Juan Carlos de Vilches y Cabrera (1765–1774 Died)
- Esteban Lorenzo de Tristán y Esmenota (1775–1783 Appointed, Bishop of Durango)
- Juan Félix de Villegas (1785–1793 Appointed, Archbishop of Guatemala)
- Juan Cruz Ruiz de Cabañas y Crespo (1794–1795 Appointed, Bishop of Guadalajara)
- José Antonio de la Huerta Caso (1797–1803 Died)
- Felipe Antonio (Juan José) Pérez del Notario (1804–1806 Died)
- Nicolás García Jerez (1806–1825 Died)
- Jorge de Viteri y Ungo (1849–1853 Died)
- José Bernardo Piñol y Aycinena (1854–1867 Appointed, Archbishop of Guatemala)
- Manuel Ulloa y Calvo (1867–1879 Died)
- Francisco Ulloa y Larios (1880–1896 Retired)
- Simeón Pereira y Castellón (1902–1921 Died)

Diocese of León en Nicaragua
Name changed
December 2, 1913

- Agustin Nicolas Tijerino y Loáisiga (21 November 1921 – 28 March 1945 Died)
- Isidro Augusto Oviedo y Reyes (13 June 1946 – 14 April 1969 Resigned)
- Manuel Salazar y Espinoza (30 January 1973 – 19 December 1981 Resigned)
- Julián Luis Barni Spotti (18 June 1982 – 2 April 1991 Retired)
- César Bosco Vivas Robelo (2 April 1991 – 29 June 2019 Retired)
- Sócrates René Sandigo Jirón (29 June 2019 – present)

=== Coadjutor bishops ===
- Manuel Ulloa y Calvo (1865-1867)
- Simeón Pereira y Castellón (1895-1902)

=== Auxiliary bishop ===
- Manuel Salazar y Espinoza (1969-1973), appointed bishop here

=== Other priests of this diocese who became bishops ===
- Isidro Carrillo y Salazar, appointed Auxiliary Bishop of Managua in 1913
- Canuto José Reyes y Balladares, appointed Bishop of Granada in 1915
- Octavio José Calderón y Padilla, appointed Bishop of Matagalpa in 1946

== Territorial losses ==
Year	Along with	To form
1850		Diocese of San José de Costa Rica
1913		Diocese of Granada; Archdiocese of Managua; Vicariate Apostolic of Bluefields
1962		Diocese of Esteli

== Metropolitans ==
Since it was erected, the see has had four metropolitans.

- Archdiocese of Seville (1534 − 1547)
- Archdiocese of Lima (1547 − 1743)
- Archdiocese of Guatemala (1743 − 1913)
- Archdiocese of Managua (1913 − )

== See also ==
- Catholic Church in Nicaragua
