= Carlos Jesús Patricio Baladrón Valdés =

Catholic bishop (1945–2023)

His Excellency Carlos Jesús Patricio Baladrón Valdés
- Bishop Emeritus of Guantánamo-Baracoa
- Archdiocese: Santiago de Cuba
- Appointed: 24 January 1998
- Term ended: 13 December 2006
- Predecessor: Post created
- Successor: Wilfredo Pino Estévez
- Previous posts: Auxiliary Bishop of San Cristobal de la Habana and Titular Bishop of Cibaliana (1991–1998)

Orders
- Ordination: 2 April 1977 by Pedro Claro Meurice Estiu
- Consecration: 5 January 1992 by Jaime Lucas Ortega y Alamino

Personal details
- Born: 17 March 1945 Campechuela, Cuba
- Died: 10 May 2023 (aged 78) Miami, Florida, U.S.

Carlos Jesús Patricio Baladrón Valdés (17 March 1945 – 10 May 2023) was a Cuban Roman Catholic prelate. He was auxiliary bishop of San Cristóbal de la Habana from 1992 to 1998 and bishop of Guantánamo-Baracoa from 1998 to 2006.

Catholic Church titles
Preceded by Post created	Bishop of Guantánamo-Baracoa; 1998–2006	Succeeded by Wilfredo Pino Estévez
Preceded by Post created	Titular Bishop of Cibaliana; 1991–1998	Succeeded by Geraldo Dantas de Andrade
Preceded by —	Auxiliary Bishop of San Cristobal de la Habana; 1991–1998	Succeeded by —
