= Álvaro Julio Beyra Luarca =

Cuban Catholic bishop

- Bishop Emeritus of Santísimo Salvador de Bayamo y Manzanillo
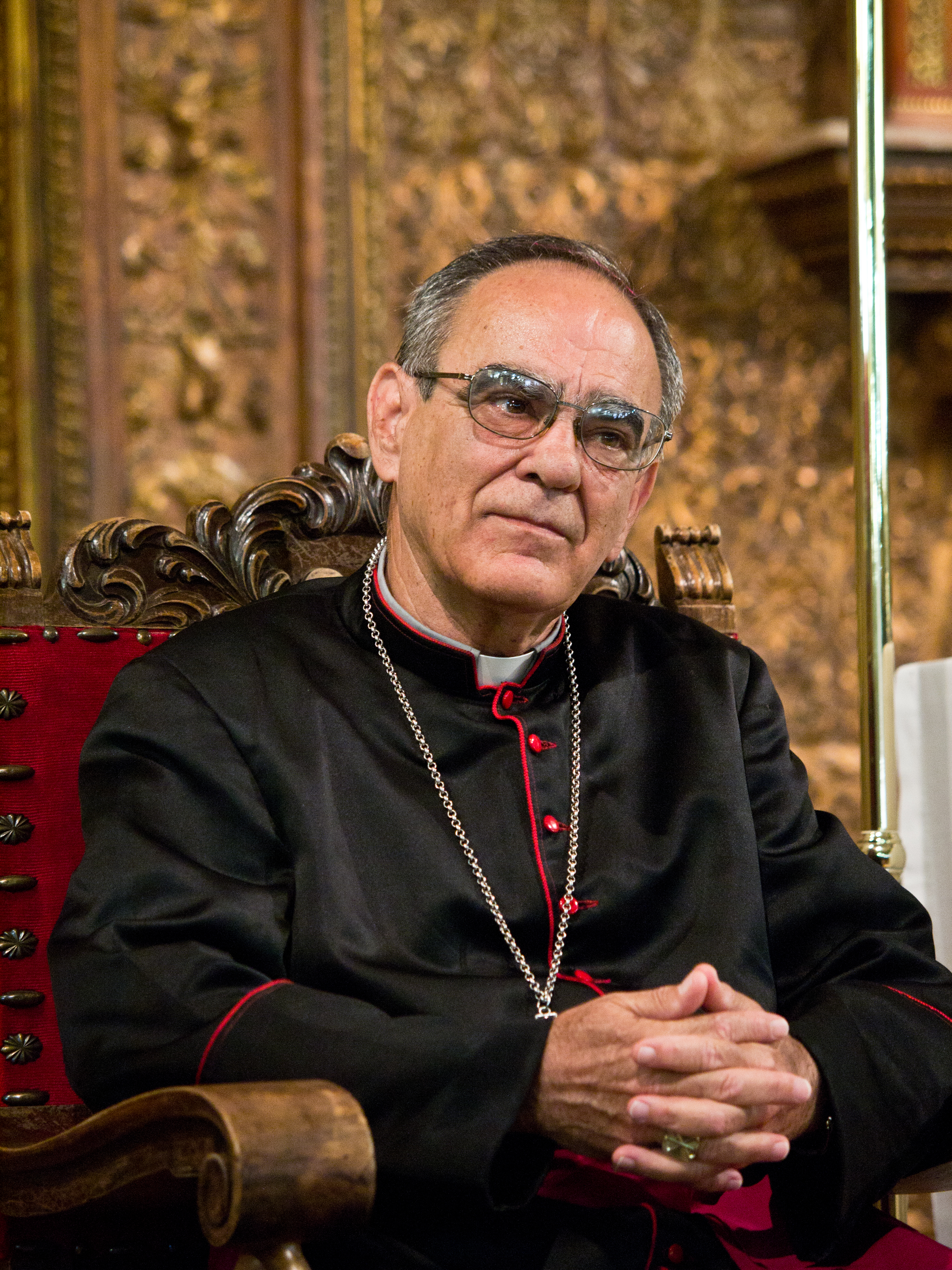
- Church: Roman Catholic Church
- Archdiocese: Santiago de Cuba
- Appointed: 9 July 2007
- Predecessor: Dionisio García Ibáñez
- Successor: Osmany Massó Cuesta

Orders
- Ordination: 12 July 1968
- Consecration: 25 August 2007 by Dionisio García Ibáñez

Personal details
- Born: 27 May 1945 (age 81) Camagüey, Cuba
- Denomination: Roman Catholicism

Álvaro Julio Beyra Luarca (born 27 May 1945) is a Cuban prelate of the Roman Catholic church. He has been serving as the bishop of Bayamo since his installation on 9 of July 2007.

As a young man, he discovered his religious vocation and entered the diocesan seminary to start his ecclesiastical education. After completing his ecclesiastical, philosophical and theological training, he was ordained priest on 14 July 1968 for his local diocese.

After many years exercising as pastoral ministry, on 9 July 2007 Pope Benedict XVI appointed him bishop of the Roman Catholic Diocese of Santísimo Salvador de Bayamo y Manzanillo, located on the city of Bayamo, Cuba. On 25 August 2007, he received the episcopal consecration by the archbishop of Santiago de Cuba, Dionisio García Ibáñez, and co-consecrators Juan García Rodríguez and Jaime Lucas Ortega y Alamino.

== Early life ==
Álvaro Julio Beyra Luarca was born on May 27, 1945, in the city of Camagüey, Cuba. He was raised in a Catholic family, the son of pediatrician and professor Manuel Alemany and Yolanda Espinosa. He had four siblings. Beyra completed his primary and secondary education at a Marist Brothers school, where he was a member of the Jeunesse Étudiante Chrétienne.

He attended University of Las Villas to study hydraulic engineering. In 1972, he earned a degree in agronomic engineering from University of Camagüey. He was the vice-president of irrigation at a Cuban agricultural company.

== Priesthood ==
In February 1989, he was invited to join the San Carlos and San Ambrosio Seminary and subsequently was sent to University of Louvain to complete his studies in theology. In February 1994, Luarca was ordinated priest by Adolfo Rodríguez Vidal of the Archdiocese of Camagüey. Afterwards, he was coadjutor of the parish of Nuevitas from 1994 to 2001, parish priest of Vertientes from 2001 to 2003 and of Nuevitas from 2003 to 2007. Luarca was in the editorial board of the diocesan magazine Enfoque, of which he was director from 1994 to 2003. He presided the diocesan secretariat of culture of Camagüey.

== Bishophood ==
On 9 July 2007, Pope Benedict XVI appointed Luarca of the Diocese of Santísimo Salvador de Bayamo y Manzanillo, making him the second bishop ever of the diocese. He was consecrated on 25 August 2007 by Dionisio García Carnero, archbishop of Santiago de Cuba.

Luarca presides the National Commission of Youth Pastoral Care of Cuba. He had an acute decompensated heart failure in 2015 and was hospitalized due to it.
