= Silvano Pedroso Montalvo =

Cuban Roman Catholic prelate (1953–2026)

The Most Reverend Silvano Pedroso Montalvo
- Bishop of Guantánamo-Baracoa
- Church: Roman Catholic Church
- Archdiocese: Santiago de Cuba
- Diocese: Guantánamo-Baracoa
- Appointed: 29 March 2018
- Installed: 9 June 2018
- Term ended: 13 June 2026
- Predecessor: Wilfredo Pino Estévez
- Successor: Vacant

Orders
- Ordination: 12 June 1995 by Jaime Lucas Cardinal Ortega y Alamino
- Consecration: 27 May 2018 by Juan García Rodríguez, Dionisio García Ibáñez and Alfredo Víctor Petit Vergel

Personal details
- Born: Silvano Herminio Pedroso Montalvo; 25 April 1953 Cárdenas, Matanzas Province, Cuba
- Died: 13 June 2026 (aged 73) Havana, Cuba
- Education: University of Havana; San Carlos y San Ambrosio Seminary
- Motto: Ámense como yo les he amado
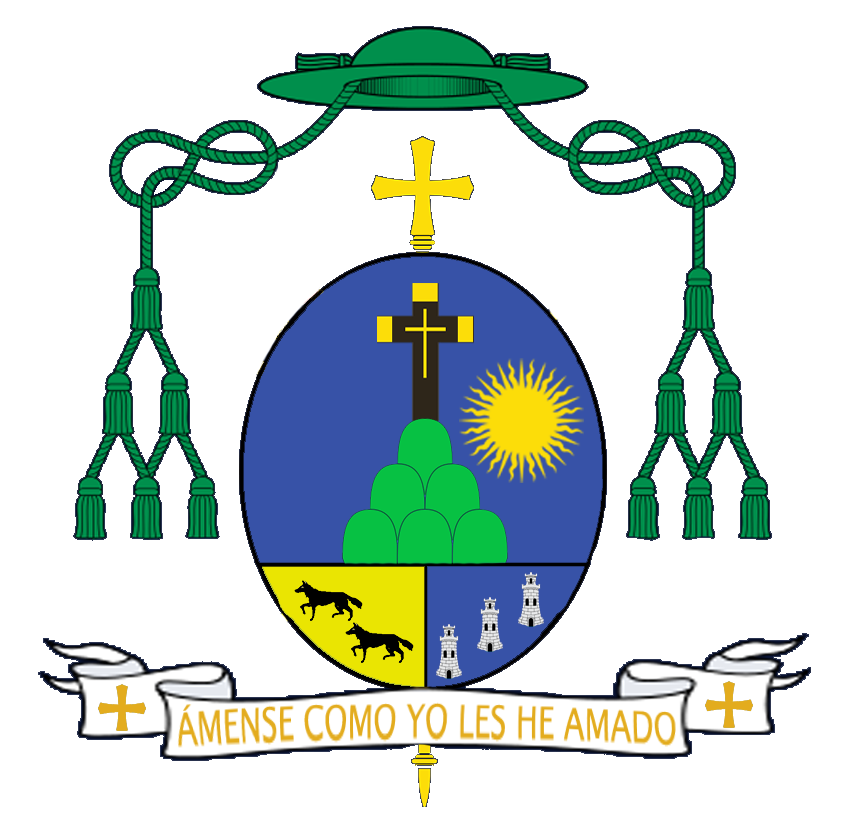
- Coat of arms: Silvano Pedroso Montalvo's coat of arms

Styles of Silvano Herminio Pedroso Montalvo
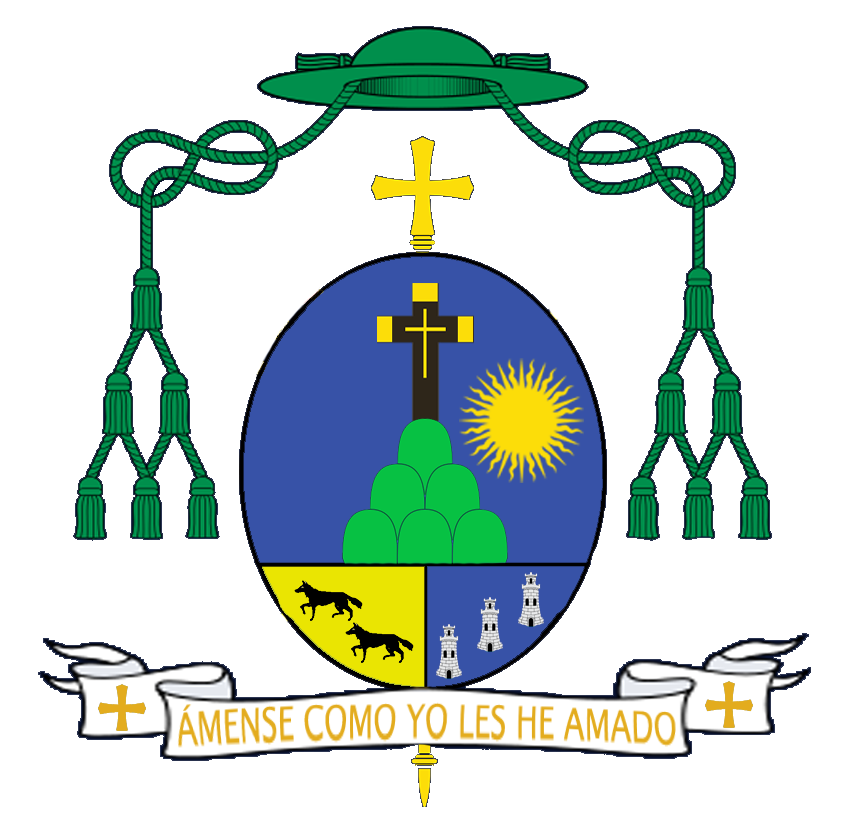
- Reference style: His Excellency; The Most Reverend
- Spoken style: Your Excellency
- Religious style: Bishop

Silvano Herminio Pedroso Montalvo (25 April 1953 – 13 June 2026) was a Cuban Roman Catholic prelate who served as the bishop of the Diocese of Guantánamo-Baracoa from 2018 until his death in 2026. He was noted for being the first Afro-descendant Catholic bishop appointed in Cuba's history.

== Early life and education ==
Silvano Herminio Pedroso Montalvo was born on 25 April 1953 in Cárdenas, in the Diocese of Matanzas. Before entering the seminary, he attended the University of Havana, where he graduated with a degree in geography and worked in that profession at the Institute of Physical Planning of Las Tunas from 1979 until 1982.

Discerning a religious vocation, he pursued his ecclesiastical and priestly formation at the San Carlos y San Ambrosio Theological Major Seminary in Havana. He was ordained a deacon on 9 January 1995 and was incardinated into the Archdiocese of San Cristóbal de la Habana. On 12 June 1995, he was ordained a priest by Cardinal Jaime Lucas Ortega y Alamino.

== Priesthood ==
During his priestly ministry in the Archdiocese of Havana, Pedroso served in various pastoral roles, including:

- Parish priest of San Felipe Neri in Quivicán (1995)
- Parish priest of Los Santos Apóstoles Felipe y Santiago in Bejucal
- Parish priest of San Pedro in Quivicán
- Parish priest of San Julián and Nuestra Señora del Rosario in Melena del Sur
- Parish priest of Santa Catalina Mártir in Güines
- Parish priest of Santa Catalina de Siena, Havana
- Diocesan director of vocational pastoral ministry
- Director of the San Juan María Vianney Priest House in Havana

In 2013, he was appointed parish priest of the Nuestra Señora del Pilar parish in the Cerro municipality of Havana, a role he maintained until his episcopal appointment.

== Episcopate ==
On 29 March 2018, Pope Francis appointed Pedroso as the Bishop of the Diocese of Guantánamo-Baracoa, filling a vacancy left after Wilfredo Pino Estévez was reassigned to the Archdiocese of Camagüey. He received his episcopal consecration on 27 May 2018 at the Havana Cathedral from Archbishop Juan de la Caridad García Rodríguez, with Archbishop Dionisio García Ibáñez and Bishop Alfredo Víctor Petit Vergel serving as co-consecrators. He was formally installed in his diocese on 9 June 2018.

In February 2026, amid a critical nationwide fuel and energy crisis in Cuba, Pedroso was the only Cuban bishop able to travel to Rome to fulfill the scheduled ad limina visit with Pope Leo XIV, representing the Conference of Catholic Bishops of Cuba to report on the pastoral realities of the island.

== Death ==
Pedroso died in Havana on 13 June 2026, at the age of 73.

In an obituary published by pontifical foundation Aid to the Church in Need, Veronika Katz, the project coordinator who worked closely with him for several years described Bishop Silvano as "a very simple man, joyful and with a great sense of humour. Even in the most difficult circumstances he always had a smile and a joke. What I remember most was how close he was to the people and how naturally he always thought of the needs of others before his own.”

Catholic Church titles
Preceded by Wilfredo Pino Estévez	Bishop of Guantánamo-Baracoa; 2018–2026	Succeeded by Vacant
