= José Domínguez Rodríguez =

Cuban bishop (1915–1986)

Bishop José Domínguez Rodríguez
- Born: May 29, 1915; Havana, Cuba
- Died: December 11, 1986 (aged 71); Matanzas, Cuba

Bishop José Maximino Eusebio Domínguez y Rodríguez (29 May 1915 in Havana, Cuba – 11 December 1986 in Matanzas, Cuba) was Bishop of the Roman Catholic Diocese of Matanzas (1961–1987) and Auxiliary Bishop of the Roman Catholic Archdiocese of Havana (1960–1961).

== Life ==
His parents were Juan Domínguez and Trinidad Rodríguez. He was baptized at the Church of Nuestra Señora de la Caridad (Our Lady of Charity) in Havana.

Bishop Dominguez studied philosophy at San Carlos and San Ambrosio Seminary and theology at Pontifical Gregorian University in Rome, Italy.

He was ordained a priest on June 13, 1943, by the Archbishop of Havana Mons. Manuel Arteaga y Betancourt, in the Church of Espíritu Santo (Holy Spirit). He was named “camarero secreto supernumerario” by Pope Pius XII on October 7, 1950.

Bishop Dominguez was appointed Titular Bishop of Caeciri and Auxiliary Bishop of the Archdiocese of Havana by Pope John XXIII on March 31, 1960. He was consecrated on May 15, 1960, in the Cathedral of Havana along with Mons. Eduardo Boza-Masvidal by Mons. Evelio Díaz-Cía, Titular Archbishop of Petra di Palestina, co-adjutor sedis datus of Havana, assisted by Mons. Carlos Riu Anglés, Bishop of the Diocese of Camagüey(now Archdiocese of Camagüey), and Mons. Alfredo Muller y San Martín, Titular Bishop of Anea and Apostalic Administrator “sede vacante” of the Diocese of Cienfuegos. He was later appointed as Bishop of the Diocese of Matanzas on July 18, 1961. He participated in the Second Vatican Council (1962–1965).

Bishop Dominguez died of a heart attack after an operation on December 11, 1986.
