= COCC =

COCC may refer to:

- Central Oregon Community College in the United States
- Conference of Catholic Bishops of Cuba (Spanish: Conferencia de Obispos Católicos de Cuba)
- Comilla City Corporation in Bangladesh
- Chemtrails over the Country Club, a studio album by Lana Del Rey
