= Héctor Luis Lucas Peña Gómez =

Cuban Roman Catholic prelate (1929–2025)

The Most Reverend Héctor Luis Lucas Peña Gómez
- Bishop Emeritus of Holguín
- Archdiocese: Santiago de Cuba
- Diocese: Holguín
- Appointed: January 8, 1979
- Term ended: November 14, 2005
- Predecessor: Position established
- Successor: Emilio Aranguren Echeverria
- Previous posts: Auxiliary Bishop of Santiago de Cuba and Titular Bishop of Novaliciana (1970–1979)

Orders
- Ordination: June 26, 1955
- Consecration: March 19, 1970 by Cesare Zacchi, Pedro Claro Meurice Estiu, Francisco Oves-Fernandez
- Rank: <! ---------- Personal details ---------->

Personal details
- Born: October 18, 1929 Gibara, Cuba
- Died: December 18, 2025 (aged 96) Holguín, Cuba
- Motto: Quam investigabiles viae eius

Héctor Luis Lucas Peña Gómez (October 18, 1929 – December 18, 2025) was a Cuban Roman Catholic prelate. He was an auxiliary bishop of Santiago de Cuba (1970–1979) and diocesan bishop of Holguín (1979–2005).

== Life and ministry ==
Héctor Luis Lucas Peña Gómez was born in Gibara on October 18, 1929. He studied humanities and philosophy at the San Basilio Magno Seminary in El Cobre and studied theology at the Santo Tomás de Aquino Seminary in Santo Domingo, Dominican Republic.

He was ordained a priest on June 26, 1955, for the Archdiocese of Santiago de Cuba.

On January 12, 1970, Pope Paul VI appointed him auxiliary bishop of Santiago de Cuba and titular bishop of Novaliciana. He was consecrated as a bishop on March 19, 1970, at the Church of San Isidoro, Holguín. The liturgy was presided by Cesare Zacchi, the Vatican's representative in Cuba; the co-consecrators were Pedro Claro Meurice Estiu and Francisco Oves-Fernandez.

On January 8, 1979, with the creation of the Diocese of Holguín by Pope John Paul II, he was appointed the first bishop of the new diocese. He served as bishop of Holguín until November 14, 2005, when Pope Benedict XVI accepted his resignation for reasons of age. After his retirement, he was bishop emeritus of Holguín.

Peña Gómez died on December 18, 2025, at the age of 96.

Catholic Church titles
Preceded by Position established	Bishop of Holguín; 1979–2005	Succeeded by Emilio Aranguren Echeverria
Preceded by Joseph Gregory Vath	Titular Bishop of Novaliciana; 1970–1979	Succeeded by Achille Silvestrini
Preceded by —	Auxiliary Bishop of Santiago de Cuba; 1970–1979	Succeeded by —
