= Cibaliana =

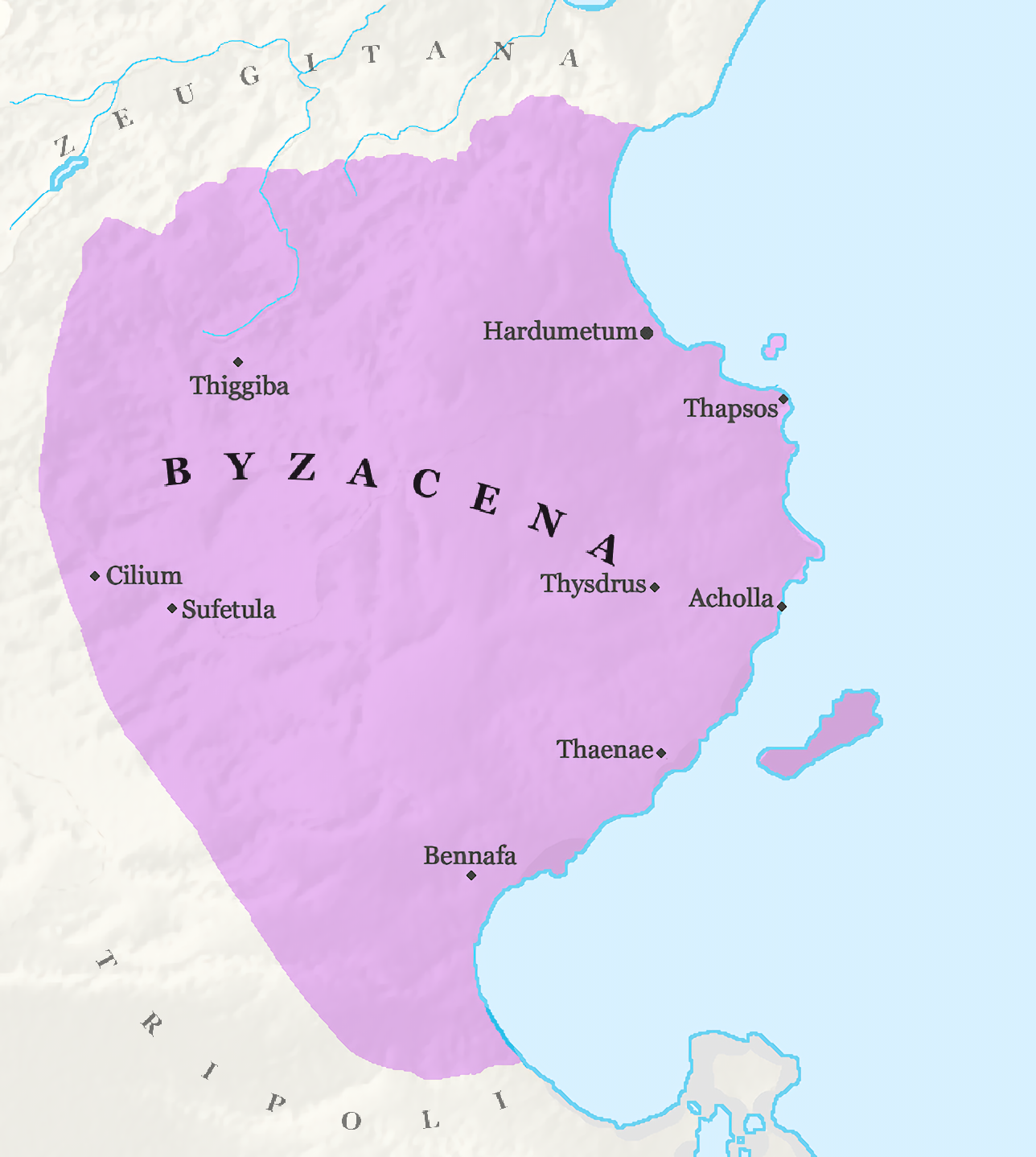
Byzacena in the fourth century

Cibaliana (or Cerbaliana) was a city of the Roman province of Africa Proconsularis, later Byzacena (modern Tunisia).

There are two known bishops of this ancient episcopal see.

- Donatus (not to be confused with Donatus Magnus) was present at the Council of Carthage in 256, where he discussed the problem of the Lapsi.
- The Donatist Bishop Cresconius, was present the Council of Carthage in 411. There was no Catholic bishop at this time.

Cibaliana was re-established as a titular see of the Catholic Church in 1989. Titular bishops are;

- Antônio Carlos do Nascimento 29 Nov 2025 to present
- Geraldo Dantas de Andrade, S.C.I. 18 Feb 1998 to 1 May 2021. Appointed auxiliary bishop of the Roman Catholic Archdiocese of São Luís do Maranhão, Brazil, from 1998 to 2010.
- Carlos Jesús Patricio Baladrón Valdés 16 Nov 1991 to 24 Jan 1998. Appointed, Bishop of the Diocese of Guantánamo-Baracoa in 1998.
