= Conference of Catholic Bishops of Cuba =

Assembly of Catholic bishops

The Conference of Catholic Bishops of Cuba (Spanish: Conferencia de Obispos Católicos de Cuba, COCC) is the episcopal conference of the Catholic Church in Cuba.

The COCC is a member of the Latin American Episcopal Conference.

List of presidents of the Bishops' Conference:

1958 - 1963: Manuel Arteaga y Betancourt, archbishop of San Cristobal de la Habana

1963 - 1970: Evelio Diaz y Cia, archbishop of San Cristobal de la Habana

1970 - 1973: Francisco Oves Ricardo Fernandez, Archbishop of San Cristobal de la Habana

1973 - 1976: Jose Eusebio Maximino y Domínguez Rodríguez, Bishop of Matanzas

1976 - 1979: Francisco Oves Ricardo Fernandez, Archbishop of San Cristobal de la Habana

1979 - 1982: Pedro Claro Meurice Estiu, archbishop of Santiago de Cuba

1982 - 1988: Adolfo Rodríguez Herrera, archbishop of Camagüey

1988 - 1998: Jaime Lucas Ortega y Alamino, archbishop of San Cristobal de la Habana

1998 - 2001: Adolfo Rodríguez Herrera, archbishop of Camagüey

2001 - 2007: Jaime Lucas Ortega y Alamino, archbishop of San Cristobal de la Habana

2007 - 2010: Juan García Rodríguez, archbishop of Camagüey

2010 - 2017 : Dionisio Guillermo García Ibáñez, archbishop of Santiago de Cuba

2017 - ... : Emilio Aranguren Echeverría, bishop of Holguín.

== See also ==
- Catholic Church in Cuba
