= Valentín Zubizarreta y Unamunsaga =

Cuban prelate

The Most Reverend Valentín Zubizarreta y Unamunsaga OCD
- Zubizarreta in a Cuban stamp
- See: Santiago de Cuba
- Appointed: 30 March 1925
- Installed: 28 June 1925
- Term ended: 26 November 1948
- Predecessor: Felix Ambrosio Guerra, SDB
- Successor: Enrique Pérez Serantes
- Previous posts: Bishop of Camagüey; Bishop of Cienfuegos

Orders
- Ordination: 18 December 1886
- Consecration: 8 November 1914 by Adolfo Alejandro Nouel; Pedro Ladislao González y Estrada; Antonio Aurelio Torres y Sanz, OCD

Personal details
- Born: Manuel Zubizarreta y Unamunsaga; 2 November 1862 Marquina, Álava, Spain
- Died: 26 February 1948 (aged 85) Santiago de Cuba, Cuba
- Buried: St. Ifigenia Cemetery, Santiago de Cuba, Cuba
- Profession: Priest, archbishop, educator

Valentín de la Asunción Zubizarreta y Unamunsaga, OCD (Etxebarria, 2 November 1862 – 26 February 1948) was a Cuban prelate of the Catholic Church, born in the Basque Country. He served as Bishop of Camagüey from 1914 to 1922, Bishop of Cienfuegos from 1922 to 1925, and Archbishop of Santiago de Cuba from 1925 to 1948.

== Biography ==
=== Early life and education ===
Manuel Zubizarreta y Unamunsaga was born on 2 November 1862 in Etxebarria, Bizkaia, Spain. In 1879, he entered the novitiate of the Discalced Carmelites in Larrea, and upon first profession of vows, took the name of Valentín de la Asunción.

=== Priesthood ===
Zubizarreta was ordained a priest at the Larrea novitiate on 18 December 1886, and celebrated his Mass in Marquina the next day. In 1887, he was appointed professor of dogmatic theology at the Carmelite college in Burgos. In 1892, he was elected prior of the monastery in Vitoria-Gasteiz. In 1900, he was elected provincial of the Navarre Province of the Discalced Carmelites. In 1903, he was appointed visitor of the order in Cuba and Chile.

From 1907 to 1912, Zubizarreta lived in Rome, where he served as General Secretary, the assistant to the Superior General of the Discalced Carmelites. In 1912, he returned to Spain, where he was reelected provincial of Navarre.

=== Episcopacy ===
It was during his term as Navarre provincial that Zubizarreta was raised to the episcopacy. He was appointed Bishop of Camagüey by Pope Pius X on 25 May 1914. His episcopal consecration took place in the Carmelites church of Nuestra Señora de La Merced in Camagüey. His principal consecrator was Archbishop of Santo Domingo Adolfo Alejandro Nouel, and co-consecrators were Bishop of San Cristóbal de la Habana Pedro Ladislao González y Estrada and Bishop of Cienfuegos Antonio Aurelio Torres y Sanz, OCD. Bishop of Pinar del Río José Manuel Dámaso Rúiz y Rodríguez preached the homily.

On 3 January 1916 Zubizarreta was appointed apostolic administrator of the Diocese of Cienfuegos, the episcopacy of which was vacant upon Bishop Antonio Torres y Sanz. On 24 February 1922, Pope Pius XI appointed him Bishop of Cienfuegos. On 28 January 1925, Bishop of Santiago de Cuba Feliz Ambrosio Guerra Fezza, SDB, resigned, and Zubizarreta was appointed apostolic administrator. On 30 March 1925 he was appointed Archbishop of Santiago de Cuba and reverted to being apostolic administrator of the Diocese of Cienfuegos. He was installed Archbishop of Santiago de Cuba on 28 June 1925. He continued to also administer the Diocese of Cienfuegos were over 10 years, until the appointment of Eduardo Martínez Dalmau as bishop on 16 November 1935.

On 13 July 1934, Zubizarreta was appointed Assistant at the Pontifical Throne by Pope Pius XI. In 1936, he oversaw the Diocesan Eucharistic Congress, and the coronation of Our Lady of Charity on 20 December of that year. He built the National Shrine of El Cobre and founded the Seminary of St. Basil the Great. He was also a great patron of Catholic Action groups, and in 1943 and 1944, presided over induction ceremonies of the Catholic Youth and Catholic Knights organizations. He was awarded the Order of Carlos Manuel de Céspedes of Cuba and named Honorary Citizen of the city of Santiago de Cuba.

Despite his advanced age, Zubizarreta traveled extensively through his large archdiocese, and made frequent trips to Havana by plane.

=== Death ===
Valentín Zubizarreta y Unamunsaga died of bronchopneumonia on Thursday, 26 February 1948 in the sanatorium of Santiago de Cuba. His decline in health was a quick one, having been working even the past Saturday. He was buried on Saturday, 28 February at St. Ifigenia Cemetery in Santiago de Cuba, after a procession from the cathedral drawing crowds estimated at 40,000 to 85,000 people.

== Episcopal lineage ==
- Cardinal Scipione Rebiba
- Cardinal Giulio Antonio Santorio (1566)
- Cardinal Girolamo Bernerio, OP (1586)
- Archbishop Galeazzo Sanvitale (1604)
- Cardinal Ludovico Ludovisi (1621)
- Cardinal Luigi Caetani (1622)
- Cardinal Ulderico Carpegna (1630)
- Cardinal Paluzzo Paluzzi Altieri degli Albertoni (1666)
- Pope Benedict XIII (1675)
- Pope Benedict XIV (1724)
- Pope Clement XIII (1743)
- Cardinal Bernardino Giraud (1767)
- Cardinal Alessandro Mattei (1777)
- Cardinal Pietro Francesco Galleffi (1819)
- Cardinal Giacomo Filippo Fransoni (1822)
- Cardinal Carlo Sacconi (1851)
- Cardinal Edward Henry Howard (1872)
- Cardinal Mariano Rampolla (1882)
- Cardinal Rafael Merry del Val (1900)
- Archbishop Adolfo Alejandro Nouel (1904)
- Archbishop Valentín Zubizarreta y Unamunsaga (1914)

== Awards and honors ==
- Assistant at the Pontifical Throne, 1934
- Order of Carlos Manuel de Céspedes of Cuba

== Bibliography ==
- Medulla Theologiæ Dogmaticæ (1948)
- Teologia Dogmaica Scholastica (1949)
