= Alfonso Bernardo de los Ríos y Guzmán =

Archbishop of Granada

Most Reverend Alfonso Bernardo de los Ríos y Guzmán
- Archbishop of Granada
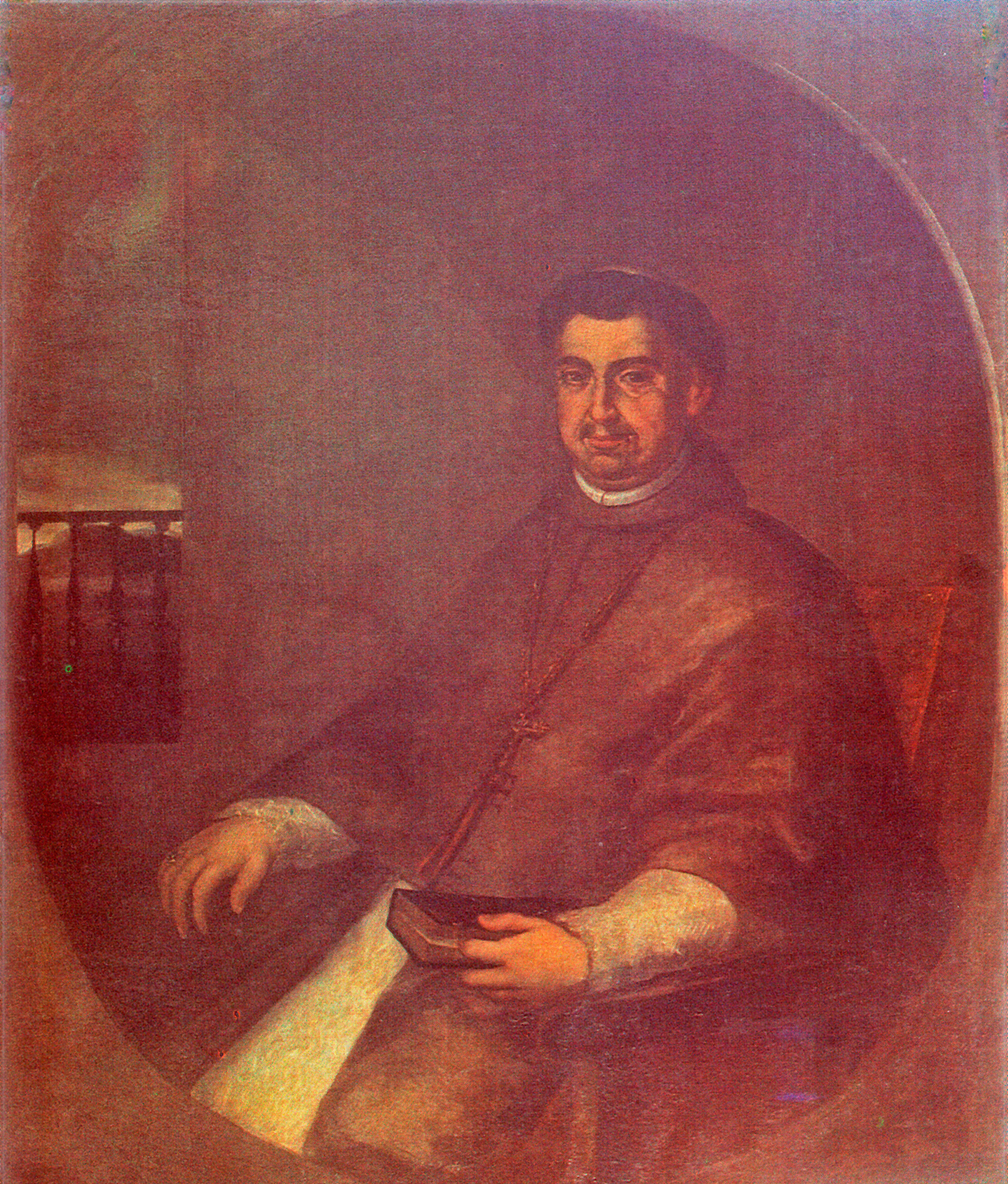
- Retrato de Alonso de los Ríos Guzmán
- Church: Catholic Church
- Archdiocese: Archdiocese of Granada
- In office: 1677–1692
- Predecessor: Francisco de Rois y Mendoza
- Successor: Francisco Eustaquio Perea Porras
- Previous posts: Bishop of Santiago de Cuba (1668–1669); Bishop of Ciudad Rodrigo (1671–1677)

Personal details
- Born: 1626 Granada, Spain
- Died: 5 October 1692 (age 66)

Alfonso Bernardo de los Ríos y Guzmán, O.SS.T. (1626 – 5 October 1692) was a Roman Catholic prelate who served as Archbishop of Granada (1677–1692), Bishop of Ciudad Rodrigo (1671–1677), and Bishop of Santiago de Cuba (1668–1669).

== Biography ==
Alfonso Bernardo de los Ríos y Guzmán was born in Granada, Spain in 1626 and ordained a priest in the Trinitarian Order. On 17 September 1668, he was appointed during the papacy of Pope Clement IX as Bishop of Santiago de Cuba. In 1669, he was consecrated bishop by Antonio Sanz Lozano, Bishop of Cartagena. On 16 November 1671, he was appointed during the papacy of Pope Clement X as Bishop of Ciudad Rodrigo. On 13 September 1677, he was appointed during the papacy of Pope Innocent XI as Archbishop of Granada. He served as Archbishop of Granada until his death on 5 October 1692.

== External links and additional sources ==
- Cheney, David M. "Archdiocese of Santiago de Cuba". Catholic-Hierarchy.org. (for Chronology of Bishops) ^{[self-published]}
- Chow, Gabriel. "Metropolitan Archdiocese of Santiago". GCatholic.org. (for Chronology of Bishops) ^{[self-published]}
- Cheney, David M. "Diocese of Ciudad Rodrigo". Catholic-Hierarchy.org. (for Chronology of Bishops) ^{[self-published]}
- Chow, Gabriel. "Diocese of Ciudad Rodrigo". GCatholic.org. (for Chronology of Bishops) ^{[self-published]}
- Cheney, David M. "Archdiocese of Granada". Catholic-Hierarchy.org. (for Chronology of Bishops) ^{[self-published]}
- Chow, Gabriel. "Metropolitan Archdiocese of Granada(Spain)". GCatholic.org. (for Chronology of Bishops) ^{[self-published]}

Catholic Church titles
Preceded by Juan de Sancto Mathía Sáenz de Mañozca y Murillo	Bishop of Santiago de Cuba; 1668–1669	Succeeded by Gabriel Díaz Vara Calderón
Preceded by Miguel de Cárdenas	Bishop of Ciudad Rodrigo; 1671–1677	Succeeded by Juan de Andaya y Sotomayor
Preceded by Francisco de Rois y Mendoza	Archbishop of Granada; 1677–1692	Succeeded by Martín de Ascargorta Ladrón de Guevara
