= Juan Antonio García de Palacios =

Bishop of Santiago de Cuba, Roman Catholic

Most Reverend Juan Antonio García de Palacios
- Bishop of Santiago de Cuba
- Church: Catholic Church
- Diocese: Diocese of Santiago de Cuba
- In office: 1677–1682
- Predecessor: Gabriel Díaz Vara Calderón
- Successor: Baltasar de Figueroa

Orders
- Consecration: 20 Nov 1678 by Manuel Fernández de Santa Cruz y Sahagún

Personal details
- Born: 1622 México
- Died: 1 Jun 1682 (age 60) Santiago, Cuba

Juan Antonio García de Palacios y García (1622–1682) was a Roman Catholic prelate who served as Bishop of Santiago de Cuba (1677–1682).

== Biography ==
Juan Antonio García de Palacios was born in 1622 in México. On 13 Sep 1677, he was appointed during the papacy of Pope Innocent XI as Bishop of Santiago de Cuba. On 20 Nov 1678, he was consecrated bishop by Manuel Fernández de Santa Cruz y Sahagún, Bishop of Tlaxcala, with Father Francisco de Aguiar y Seijas y Ulloa assisting. He served as Bishop of Santiago de Cuba until his death on 1 Jun 1682. While bishop, he was the principal co-consecrator of Francisco de Aguiar y Seijas y Ulloa, Bishop of Michoacán (1678).

== External links and additional sources ==
- Cheney, David M. "Archdiocese of Santiago de Cuba". Catholic-Hierarchy.org. (for Chronology of Bishops) ^{[self-published]}
- Chow, Gabriel. "Metropolitan Archdiocese of Santiago". GCatholic.org. (for Chronology of Bishops) ^{[self-published]}

Catholic Church titles
Preceded by Gabriel Díaz Vara Calderón	Bishop of Santiago de Cuba; 1677–1682	Succeeded by Baltasar de Figueroa
