= Jan de Witte (bishop) =

Most Reverend Jan de Witte
- Bishop of Santiago de Cuba
- Church: Catholic Church
- Diocese: Diocese of Santiago de Cuba
- In office: 1518–1525
- Predecessor: None
- Successor: Sebastián de Salamanca

Personal details
- Born: 6 August 1475 Bruges, County of Flanders
- Died: 18 September 1540 (age 65) Bruges

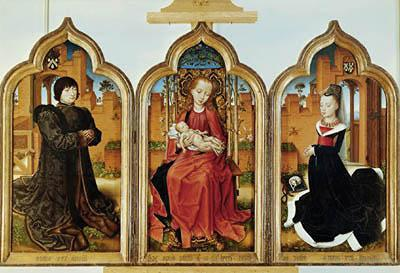
An anonymous 1473 Triptych of Jan de Witte and Maria Hoose, parents of bishop Jan de Witte, on either site of the Virgin Mary

Jan de Witte O.P. (1475–1540), also Joannes Albus in Latin and Juan de Witte Hoos or Juan de Ubite in some Spanish sources, was a Flemish renaissance humanist and Roman Catholic prelate who served as the first Bishop of Cuba (1518–1525).

== Biography ==
Jan de Witte was the son of Maria Hoose and the merchant Jan de Witte, lord of Ruddervoorde, who was mayor of Bruges in 1473. The De Witte family traded with Spain and Jan was sent to Valladolid for training, where he ended up being ordained a priest in the Order of Preachers. In 1506 he was called back to Flanders, probably Mechelen, to be the teacher Spanish and Dutch for the children of Philip I of Castile and Joanna of Castile.

On 15 May 1514, he was appointed during the papacy of Pope Leo X as Titular Bishop of Selymbria near Constantinople and on 11 February 1517 as Bishop of Baracoa on Cuba. On 28 April 1522, during the papacy of Pope Adrian VI, this diocese was renamed and his title was changed to Bishop of Santiago de Cuba. He served in Santiago de Cuba until his resignation on 4 April 1525. He retired to his native city where he lived in a stately palace later known as Hof van Cuba ("Cuba's court"). He died there on 18 September 1540 In his will he established a chair of literature and a chair of theology, named the "Cuba foundation".

== External links and additional sources ==
- Cheney, David M. "Archdiocese of Santiago de Cuba". Catholic-Hierarchy.org. (for Chronology of Bishops) ^{[self-published]}
- Chow, Gabriel. "Metropolitan Archdiocese of Santiago". GCatholic.org. (for Chronology of Bishops) ^{[self-published]}

Catholic Church titles
Preceded by None	Bishop of Baracoa; 1517–1522	Succeeded by None
Preceded by None	Bishop of Santiago de Cuba; 1522–1525	Succeeded by Sebastián de Salamanca
