= Pedro de Reina Maldonado =

Most Reverend Pedro de Reina Maldonado
- Bishop-Elect of Santiago de Cuba
- Church: Catholic Church
- Diocese: Diocese of Santiago de Cuba
- In office: 1659–1660
- Predecessor: Juan de Montiel
- Successor: Juan de Sancto Mathía Sáenz de Mañozca y Murillo

Personal details
- Born: 1599 Lima, Peru
- Died: 9 October 1660 (aged 60–61) Santiago de Cuba

Pedro de Reina Maldonado (1599 – 9 October 1660) was a Roman Catholic prelate who served as Bishop-Elect of Santiago de Cuba (1659–1660).

== Biography ==
Pedro de Reina Maldonado was born in Lima, Peru in 1599. On 10 November 1659, he was appointed during the papacy of Pope Alexander VII as Bishop of Santiago de Cuba. He died before he was consecrated on 9 October 1660.

== External links and additional sources ==
- Cheney, David M. "Archdiocese of Santiago de Cuba". Catholic-Hierarchy.org. (for Chronology of Bishops) ^{[self-published]}
- Chow, Gabriel. "Metropolitan Archdiocese of Santiago". GCatholic.org. (for Chronology of Bishops) ^{[self-published]}

Catholic Church titles
Preceded by Juan de Montiel	Bishop-Elect of Santiago de Cuba; 1659–1660	Succeeded by Juan de Sancto Mathía Sáenz de Mañozca y Murillo
