= Joan Perez de Lazarraga =

Basque writer

Juan Pérez de Lazarraga
- Born: c. 1548; Larrea, Álava, Crown of Castile
- Died: 11 April 1605 (aged 56–57); Larrea, Álava, Crown of Castile
- Occupations: Writer; genealogist

Juan Pérez de Lazarraga (Basque: Joan Perez Lazarraga; c. 1548 – 11 April 1605) was a Basque writer, who was born and died in Larrea, Álava. Lazarraga, member of a family of the lower nobility originating in Oñati, was the Lord of Larrea.

He is known for his manuscript, discovered in 2004. The text, written in the previously unattested Alavese dialect of Basque, is of great importance to philologists and linguists.

== Biography ==
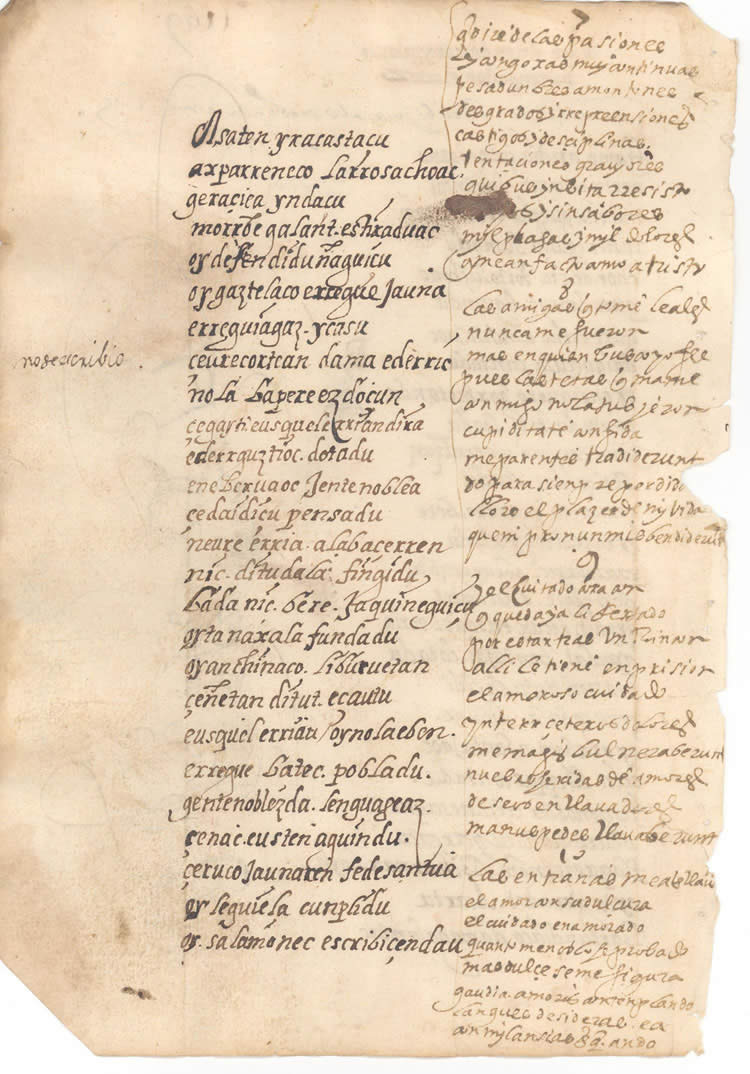
A page in Lazarraga's own handwriting

Little is known about Lazarraga's life. He was the son of Pedro Pérez de Lazarraga, Lord of Larrea, and his wife Elena López de Uralde Ordoñana. His birth date is unknown, but since his parents were married in October 1546 and he was the eldest of five siblings, dates from 1547 to 1550 have been suggested.

He was probably in Madrid around 1567, according to his own writings. He married Catalina González de Langarica y Vicuña in 1575. He had two children from this marriage: Agustín, who succeeded him as Lord of Larrea, and María, who married Juan Velasco y Galarreta. He died on 11 April 1605 in his hometown. Before the discovery of his manuscript, he was mostly known for authoring a genealogical chronicle of his family.

== Manuscript ==
As a writer, he was one of the few Renaissance authors in Basque. His manuscript was found in 2004 in an antique shop in Madrid. The Foral Government of Gipuzkoa purchased it and made it available via the internet. It is one of very few Basque-language texts to have survived from the 16th century, and the oldest from the Southern Basque Country. Patri Urkizu prepared the first edition, titled Dianea & Koplak. This first edition appeared as a collection of papers and was made quickly, without the necessary checks. Since then, the text has been published in facsimile form and with modernized spelling. The find is very important for Basque linguistics, as it gives insight on the history of the Basque dialect of Álava and Western Basque, presenting forms and words which had never been attested before.

The manuscript consists of two parts. The first comprises an unfinished pastoral romance, heavily inspired by Jorge de Montemayor's Diana. The second part contains 46 poems, of which 35 are in Basque and 9 in Spanish.

== See also ==
- Bernard Etxepare - another Renaissance Basque writer
