= Nicolás de la Torre Muñoz =

Most Reverend Nicolás de la Torre Muñoz
- Bishop of Santiago de Cuba
- Church: Catholic Church
- Diocese: Diocese of Santiago de Cuba
- In office: 1649–1653
- Predecessor: Martín de Zelaya y Oláriz
- Successor: Juan de Montiel

Orders
- Consecration: 19 February 1651 by Miguel de Poblete Casasola

Personal details
- Born: 1589 Mexico
- Died: 4 July 1653 (aged 63–64) Santiago de Cuba, Cuba

Nicolás de la Torre Muñoz (1589 – 4 July 1653) was a Roman Catholic prelate who served as Bishop of Santiago de Cuba (1649–1653).

== Biography ==
Nicolás de la Torre Muñoz was born in Mexico in 1589.

On 13 September 1649, he was appointed during the papacy of Pope Innocent X as Bishop of Santiago de Cuba.

On 19 February 1651, he was consecrated bishop by Miguel de Poblete Casasola, Archbishop of Manila, assisted by Father Pedro de Barrientos Lomelin.

He served as Bishop of Santiago de Cuba until his death on 4 July 1653.

While a priest, he assisted in the consecration of Diego de Guevara y Estrada, Archbishop of Santo Domingo (1642).

== External links and additional sources ==
- Cheney, David M. "Archdiocese of Santiago de Cuba". Catholic-Hierarchy.org. (for Chronology of Bishops) ^{[self-published]}
- Chow, Gabriel. "Metropolitan Archdiocese of Santiago". GCatholic.org. (for Chronology of Bishops) ^{[self-published]}

Catholic Church titles
Preceded by Martín de Zelaya y Oláriz	Bishop of Santiago de Cuba; 1649–1653	Succeeded by Juan de Montiel
