= Santi Aquila e Priscilla =

- Chiesa Parrocchiale dei Santi Aquila e Priscilla (in Italian)
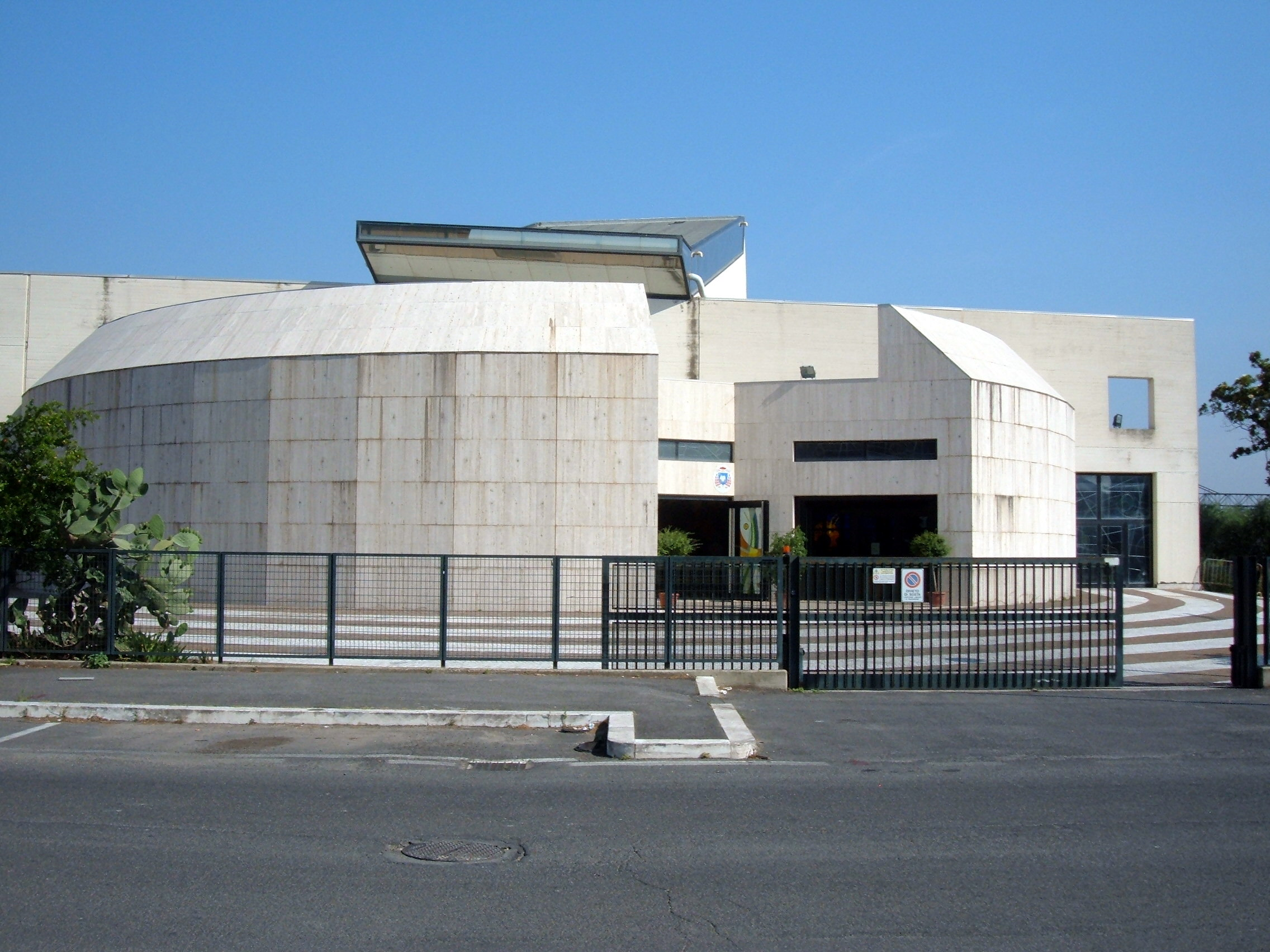
- Exterior of the church
- Click on the map for a fullscreen view
- 41°52′01″N 12°28′23″E
- Location: Via Pietro Blaserna 113, Rome
- Country: Italy
- Denomination: Roman Catholic
- Tradition: Roman Rite
- Website: Official website

History
- Status: Titular church
- Dedication: Priscilla and Aquila

Architecture
- Architectural type: Church
- Style: Modernist
- Completed: 1992

Administration
- District: Lazio
- Province: Rome

Santi Aquila e Priscilla is a Roman Catholic church dedicated to saints Aquila and Priscilla in the quartiere Portuense (Q.XI) of Rome, on via Pietro Blaserna. The church was consecrated on November 15, 1992.

In 1994, John Paul II designated it as a cardinal's titular church. The title has been held by Cardinal Juan García Rodríguez, Archbishop of Havana, since 5 October 2019.

== History ==
The Church was designed by architect Ignazio Breccia Fratadocchi and inaugurated by Cardinal Vicar Ugo Poletti on May 10, 1992. Pope John Paul II consecrated the church on November 15, 1992.

The parish was established on November 5, 1971, by a decree of Cardinal Vicar Angelo Dell'Acqua entitled Neminem fugit.

== Description ==
The church is elliptical. The chancel is dominated by a large neo-Byzantine mural and a massive pipe organ. At the side is the chapel of the Blessed Sacrament illuminated by stained glass. A nursery is located at the bottom of the church, near the main entrance.

== Cardinal-priests ==
- Jaime Lucas Ortega y Alamino (1994–2019)
- Juan de la Caridad García Rodríguez (2019–present)
