= Diego de Sarmiento =

Spanish-born Cuban Roman Catholic prelate

Most Reverend Diego de Sarmiento
- Bishop of Santiago de Cuba
- Church: Catholic Church
- Diocese: Diocese of Santiago de Cuba
- In office: 1536–1544
- Predecessor: Miguel Ramírez de Salamanca
- Successor: Fernando de Uranga

Orders
- Consecration: 1536

Personal details
- Born: Burgos, Spain
- Died: 30 May 1547 Sevilla, Spain

Diego de Sarmiento, O.Cart. (died 30 May 1547) was a Roman Catholic prelate who served as Bishop of Santiago de Cuba (1536–1544).

== Biography ==
Diego de Sarmiento was born in Burgos, Spain and ordained a priest in the Carthusian Order. On 20 October 1535, he was appointed during the papacy of Pope Paul III as Bishop of Santiago de Cuba. In 1536, he was consecrated bishop. He served as Bishop of Santiago de Cuba until his resignation in 1544. He died on 30 May 1547 in Sevilla, Spain.

== External links and additional sources ==
- Cheney, David M. "Archdiocese of Santiago de Cuba". Catholic-Hierarchy.org. (for Chronology of Bishops) ^{[self-published]}
- Chow, Gabriel. "Metropolitan Archdiocese of Santiago". GCatholic.org. (for Chronology of Bishops) ^{[self-published]}

Catholic Church titles
Preceded by Miguel Ramírez de Salamanca	Bishop of Santiago de Cuba; 1536–1544	Succeeded by Fernando de Uranga
