= Caeciri =

Roman–Berber civitas (town) and ancient diocese in Africa Proconsularis

Caeciri was a Roman–Berber civitas (town) and ancient diocese in Africa Proconsularis. Its exact location is unknown, though it must have been in the Sahel, Tunisia region south of Algiers in modern Algeria.

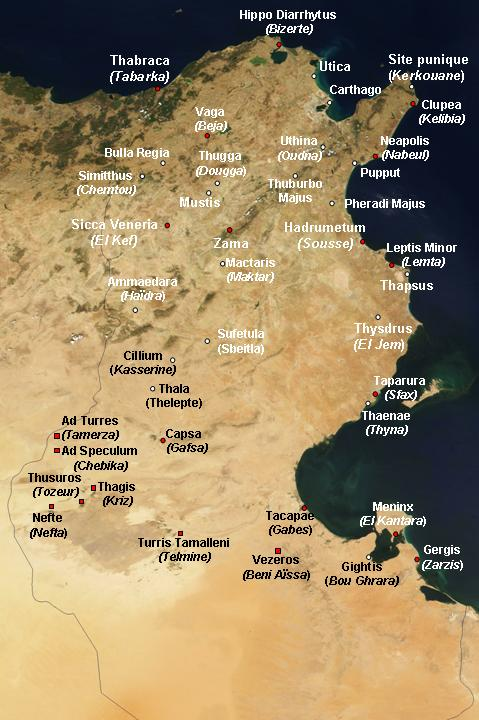
Map of Roman North African cities

== History ==
Caeciri must have been of some size as it was the seat of an ancient Christian bishopric, which survives today as a titular see of the Roman Catholic Church. Only one bishop is known from antiquity, Quobolo, who took part in the Council of Carthage (646). The recent bishop of Caeciri was Antonio Arcari, who succeeded Miklós Beer. Other bishops include José Domínguez Rodríguez of Cuba and Eduardo Francisca Pironio.
