= Miguel Ramírez de Salamanca =

Most Reverend Sebastián de Salamanca
- Bishop of Santiago de Cuba
- Church: Catholic Church
- Diocese: Diocese of Santiago de Cuba
- In office: 1530–1534
- Predecessor: Sebastián de Salamanca
- Successor: Diego de Sarmiento

Orders
- Consecration: 5 January 1533 by Alfonso Manrique de Lara y Solís

Personal details
- Born: Salamanca, Spain
- Died: 1534 Santiago de Cuba

Miguel Ramírez de Salamanca, O.P. (died 1534) was a Roman Catholic prelate who served as the Bishop of Santiago de Cuba (1530–1534).

== Biography ==
Miguel Ramírez de Salamanca was born in Salamanca, Spain and was ordained as a priest in the Order of Preachers. On 7 November, 1530, he was appointed during the papacy of Pope Clement VII as the Bishop of Santiago de Cuba. On 5 January, 1533, he was consecrated as the bishop by Alfonso Manrique de Lara y Solís, Archbishop of Seville, with Baltasar del Río, Bishop of Scala, and Luis de Vivaldis, Bishop of Arbe, serving as co-consecrators. He served as the Bishop of Santiago de Cuba until his death in 1534.

== External links and additional sources ==
- Cheney, David M. "Archdiocese of Santiago de Cuba". Catholic-Hierarchy.org. (for Chronology of Bishops) ^{[self-published]}
- Chow, Gabriel. "Metropolitan Archdiocese of Santiago". GCatholic.org. (for Chronology of Bishops) ^{[self-published]}

Catholic Church titles
Preceded by Sebastián de Salamanca	Bishop of Santiago de Cuba; 1530–1534	Succeeded by Diego de Sarmiento
