= Gabriel Díaz Vara y Calderón =

Spanish Roman Catholic prelate (1621–1676)

Most Reverend Gabriel Díaz Vara y Calderón
- Bishop of Santiago de Cuba
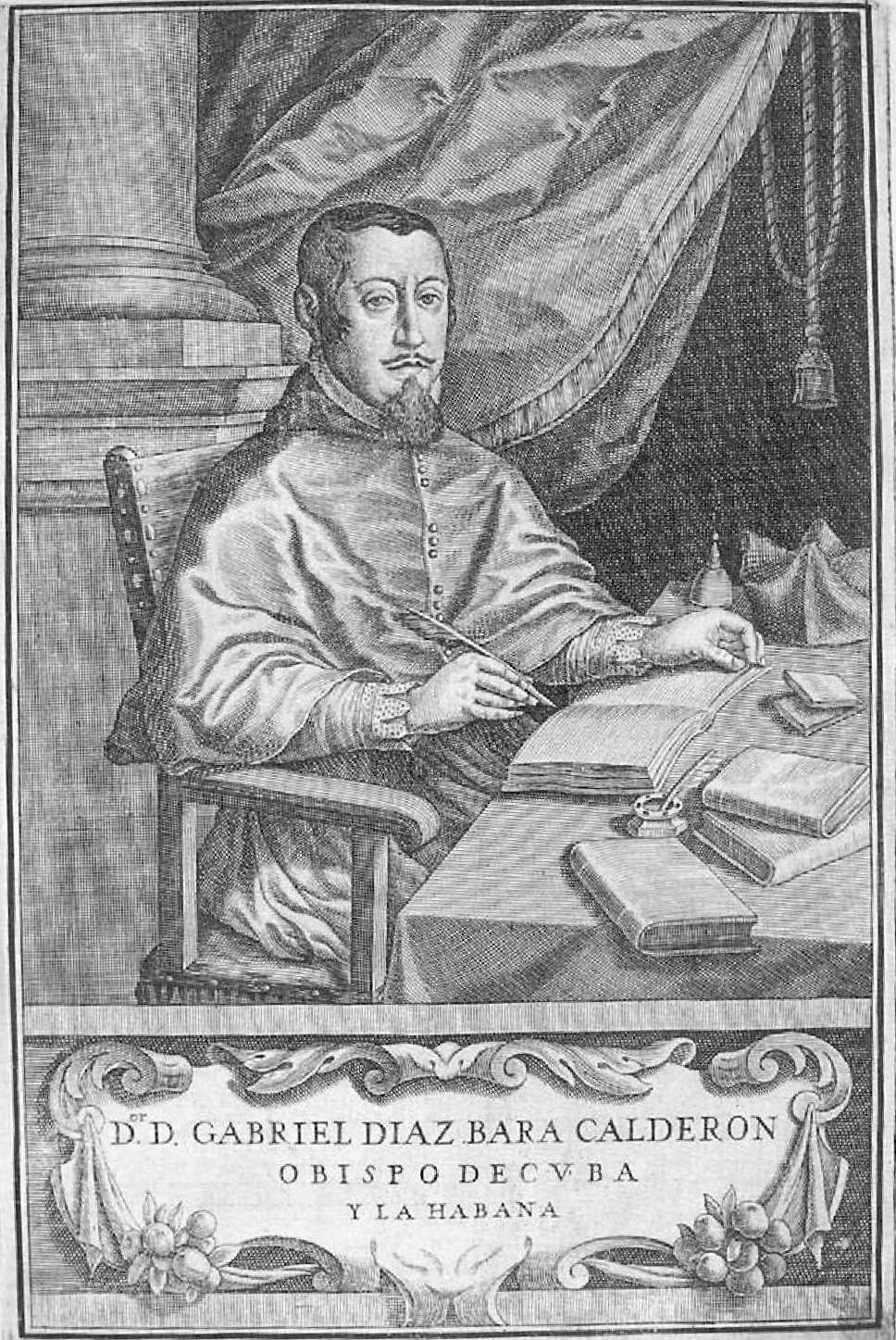
- Church: Catholic Church
- Diocese: Diocese of Santiago de Cuba
- In office: 1671–1676
- Predecessor: Alfonso Bernardo de los Ríos y Guzmán
- Successor: Juan Antonio García de Palacios

Orders
- Consecration: 4 Sep 1672 by Ambrosio Ignacio Spínola y Guzmán

Personal details
- Born: 1621 Madrid, Spain
- Died: 13 March 1676 (aged 54–55) Santiago de Cuba

Gabriel Díaz Vara y Calderón (1621–1676) was a Roman Catholic prelate who served as Bishop of Santiago de Cuba (1671–1676).

== Biography ==
Gabriel Díaz Vara y Calderón was born in Madrid, Spain in 1621. On 14 Dec 1671, he was appointed during the papacy of Pope Clement X as Bishop of Santiago de Cuba. On 4 Sep 1672, he was consecrated bishop by Ambrosio Ignacio Spínola y Guzman, Archbishop of Seville. He served as Bishop of Santiago de Cuba until his death on 13 Mar 1676.

== External links and additional sources ==
- Cheney, David M. "Archdiocese of Santiago de Cuba". Catholic-Hierarchy.org. (for Chronology of Bishops) ^{[self-published]}
- Chow, Gabriel. "Metropolitan Archdiocese of Santiago". GCatholic.org. (for Chronology of Bishops) ^{[self-published]}

Catholic Church titles
Preceded by Alfonso Bernardo de los Ríos y Guzmán	Bishop of Santiago de Cuba; 1671–1676	Succeeded by Juan Antonio García de Palacios
