= Diocese of Holguín =

Latin Catholic diocese in Cuba

Coordinates: 20.8855°N 76.2578°W

Diocese of Holguín Dioecesis Holguinensis

Location
- Country: Cuba
- Ecclesiastical province: Santiago de Cuba
- Metropolitan: Holguín

Statistics
- Area: 14,089 km^{2} (5,440 sq mi)
- Population: Total; Catholics: (as of 2006); 1,605,000; 435,000 (27.1%)
- Parishes: 28

Information
- Denomination: Catholic Church
- Sui iuris church: Latin Church
- Rite: Roman Rite
- Established: 8 January 1979 (47 years ago)
- Cathedral: Cathedral of St. Isidore

Current leadership
- Pope: Leo XIV
- Bishop: Emilio Aranguren Echeverria
- Auxiliary Bishops: Marcos Pirán Gómez

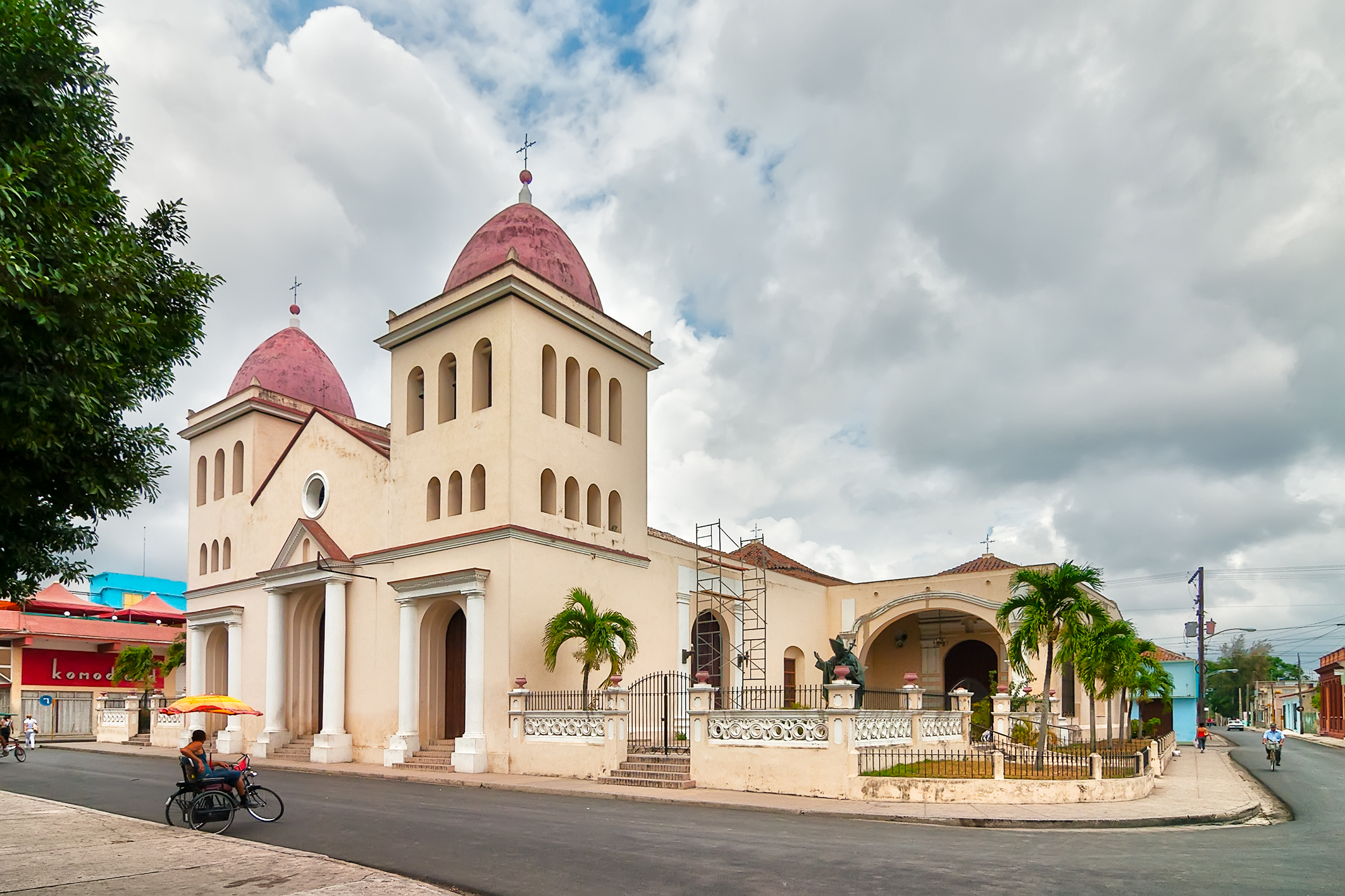
San Isidoro Cathedral in Holguin

The Diocese of Holguín (erected 8 January 1979) is a suffragan diocese of the Archdiocese of Santiago de Cuba.

== Ordinaries ==
- Héctor Luis Lucas Peña Gómez (8 January 1979 – 14 November 2005)
- Emilio Aranguren Echeverria (2005 - )

== External links and references ==
- "Diocese of Holguín". Catholic-Hierarchy.
