= Diego Evelino Hurtado de Compostela =

Roman Catholic bishop

Diego Evelino Hurtado Vélez
- Diocese: Diocese of Santiago de Cuba
- Installed: 1685
- Term ended: 1704
- Predecessor: Baltasar de Figueroa
- Successor: Jerónimo Nosti de Valdés

Personal details
- Born: 1638 Santiago de Compostela, Spain
- Died: August 29, 1704 (aged 65–66) Havana, Cuba
- Denomination: Catholicism

Bishop Diego Evelino Hurtado Vélez (1638 in Santiago de Compostela, Spain - August 29, 1704 in Havana, Cuba) was the Bishop of Diocese of Santiago de Cuba (now the Archdiocese of Santiago de Cuba). He was known as Bishop Diego Evelino Hurtado de Compostela.

On June 4, 1685, he was appointed Bishop of Santiago de Cuba by Pope Innocent XI and was ordained bishop on August 29, 1704, by Cardinal Savo Millini, Apostolic Nuncio to Spain. He donated his orchard in Havana for the building of Convent of Belén (later used as the Colegio de Belén). He died in Havana on August 29, 1704.

In 1687 he founded La Casa de Beneficencia y Maternidad de La Habana.

== External links and additional sources ==
- Cheney, David M. "Archdiocese of Santiago de Cuba". Catholic-Hierarchy.org. (for Chronology of Bishops) ^{[self-published]}
- Chow, Gabriel. "Metropolitan Archdiocese of Santiago". GCatholic.org. (for Chronology of Bishops) ^{[self-published]}
- Old Havana web article

Catholic Church titles
Preceded by Baltasar de Figueroa	Bishop of Santiago de Cuba; 1685–1704	Succeeded by Jerónimo Nosti de Valdés
