= Juan de Montiel =

Roman Catholic prelate

Most Reverend Juan de Montiel
- Bishop of Santiago de Cuba
- Church: Catholic Church
- Diocese: Diocese of Santiago de Cuba
- In office: 1655–1657
- Predecessor: Nicolás de la Torre Muñoz
- Successor: Pedro de Reina Maldonado

Orders
- Consecration: 16 July 1656 by Francisco Diego Díaz de Quintanilla y de Hevía y Valdés

Personal details
- Born: Ocón, Spain
- Died: 23 December 1657 Santiago, Cuba

Juan de Montiel (died 23 December 1657) was a Roman Catholic prelate who served as Bishop of Santiago de Cuba (1655–1657).

== Biography ==
Juan de Montiel was born in Ocón, Spain. On 14 May 1655, he was appointed during the papacy of Pope Alexander VII as Bishop of Santiago de Cuba. On 16 July 1656, he was consecrated bishop by Francisco Diego Díaz de Quintanilla y de Hevía y Valdés, Bishop of Antequera. On 30 August 1656, he was installed as Bishop of Santiago de Cuba where he served until his death on 23 December 1657.

== External links and additional sources ==
- Cheney, David M. "Archdiocese of Santiago de Cuba". Catholic-Hierarchy.org. (for Chronology of Bishops) ^{[self-published]}
- Chow, Gabriel. "Metropolitan Archdiocese of Santiago". GCatholic.org. (for Chronology of Bishops) ^{[self-published]}

Catholic Church titles
Preceded by Nicolás de la Torre Muñoz	Bishop of Santiago de Cuba; 1655–1657	Succeeded by Pedro de Reina Maldonado
