= Fernando de Uranga =

Most Reverend Fernando de Uranga
- Bishop of Santiago de Cuba
- Church: Catholic Church
- Diocese: Diocese of Santiago de Cuba
- In office: 1550–1556
- Predecessor: Diego de Sarmiento
- Successor: Bernardino de Villalpando

Orders
- Consecration: 1551

Personal details
- Born: Azpeitia, Spain
- Died: 1556 Santiago de Cuba

Fernando de Uranga or Fernando de Urango (died 1556) was a Roman Catholic prelate who served as Bishop of Santiago de Cuba (1550–1556).

== Biography ==
Fernando de Uranga was born in Azpeitia, Spain. On 4 July 1550, Fernando de Uranga was appointed during the papacy of Pope Julius III as Bishop of Santiago de Cuba. In 1551, he was consecrated bishop. He served as Bishop of Santiago de Cuba until his death in 1556.

== External links and additional sources ==
- Cheney, David M. "Archdiocese of Santiago de Cuba". Catholic-Hierarchy.org. (for Chronology of Bishops) ^{[self-published]}
- Chow, Gabriel. "Metropolitan Archdiocese of Santiago". GCatholic.org. (for Chronology of Bishops) ^{[self-published]}

Catholic Church titles
Preceded by Diego de Sarmiento	Bishop of Santiago de Cuba; 1550–1556	Succeeded by Bernardino de Villalpando
