= Diocese of Santísimo Salvador de Bayamo y Manzanillo =

Latin Catholic diocese in Cuba

Coordinates: 20.3734°N 76.6504°W

Diocese of Santisimo Salvador de Bayamo y Manzanillo Dioecesis Sanctissimi Salvatoris Bayamensis-Manzanillensis Diócesis del Santísimo Salvador de Bayamo-Manzanillo
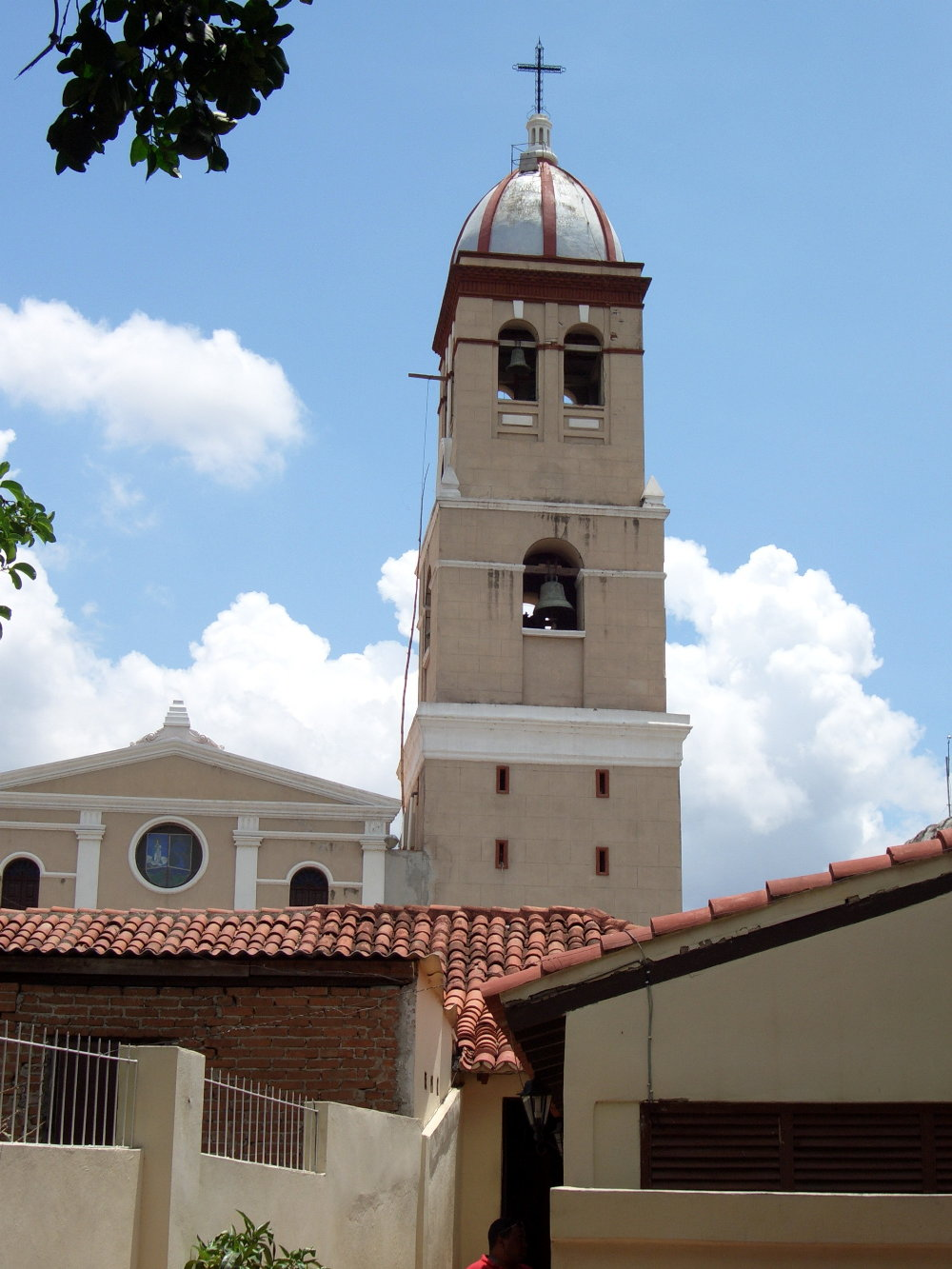
- Catedral Santísimo Salvador de Bayamo

Location
- Country: Cuba
- Metropolitan: Archdiocese of Santiago de Cuba
- Headquarters: Bayamo, Granma Province, Cuba

Statistics
- Area: 8,362 km^{2} (3,229 sq mi)
- Population: Total; Catholics: (as of 2023); 810,138; 212,000 (26.2%)
- Parishes: 11

Information
- Denomination: Catholic Church
- Sui iuris church: Latin Church
- Rite: Roman Rite
- Established: December 9, 1995; 30 years ago
- Cathedral: Cathedral of the Most Holy Saviour
- Secular priests: 19 (11 Diocesan, 8 Religious Orders)

Current leadership
- Pope: Leo XIV
- Bishop: Osmany Massó Cuesta
- Metropolitan Archbishop: Dionisio García Ibáñez
- Bishops emeritus: Álvaro Julio Beyra Luarca

The Diocese of Santisimo Salvador de Bayamo y Manzanillo (erected 9 December 1995) is a suffragan diocese of the Archdiocese of Santiago de Cuba.

== Leadership ==
Bishops of Santísimo Salvador de Bayamo y Manzanillo (Roman Rite)

- Dionisio García Ibáñez (9 December 1995 – 10 February 2007), appointed Archbishop of Santiago de Cuba
- Álvaro Julio Beyra Luarca (9 July 2007 – 3 January 2026), retired
- Osmany Massó Cuesta (3 January 2026 – Present)

== External links and references ==
- "Diocese of Santisimo Salvador de Bayamo y Manzanillo". Catholic-Hierarchy.
