= Baltasar de Figueroa =

Most Reverend Baltasar de Figueroa
- Bishop of Santiago de Cuba
- Church: Catholic Church
- Diocese: Diocese of Santiago de Cuba
- In office: 1683–1684
- Predecessor: Juan Antonio García de Palacios
- Successor: Diego Evelino Hurtado de Compostela

Personal details
- Born: 29 Dec 1634 Jaén, Spain
- Died: 8 Sep 1684 (age 49) Santiago de Cuba

Baltasar de Figueroa, O. Cist. (1634–1684) was a Roman Catholic prelate who served as Bishop of Santiago de Cuba (1683–1684).

== Biography ==
Baltasar de Figueroa was born in Jaén, Spain on 29 Dec 1634 and ordained a priest in the Cistercian Order. On 10 May 1683, he was appointed during the papacy of Pope Innocent XI as Bishop of Santiago de Cuba. He served as Bishop of Santiago de Cuba until his death on 8 Sep 1684.

== External links and additional sources ==
- Cheney, David M. "Archdiocese of Santiago de Cuba". Catholic-Hierarchy.org. (for Chronology of Bishops) ^{[self-published]}
- Chow, Gabriel. "Metropolitan Archdiocese of Santiago". GCatholic.org. (for Chronology of Bishops) ^{[self-published]}

Catholic Church titles
Preceded by Juan Antonio García de Palacios	Bishop of Santiago de Cuba; 1683–1684	Succeeded by Diego Evelino Hurtado de Compostela
