= Jerónimo Manrique de Lara y de Herrera =

Most Reverend Jerónimo Manrique de Lara y de Herrera
- Bishop of Santiago de Cuba
- Church: Catholic Church
- Diocese: Diocese of Santiago de Cuba
- In office: 1630–1644
- Predecessor: Leonel de Cervantes y Caravajal
- Successor: Martín de Zelaya y Oláriz

Personal details
- Born: 1581 Valladolid, Spain
- Died: 22 June 1644 (age 63) Santiago de Cuba, Cuba

Jerónimo Manrique de Lara y de Herrera, O. de M. (1581 – 22 June 1644) was a Roman Catholic prelate who served as Bishop of Santiago de Cuba (1630–1644).

== Biography ==
Jerónimo Manrique de Lara y de Herrera was born in Valladolid, Spain in 1581 and ordained a priest in the Order of the Blessed Virgin Mary of Mercy. On 7 January 1630, he was appointed during the papacy of Pope Urban VIII as Bishop of Santiago de Cuba and installed on 30 November 1630. He served as Bishop of Santiago de Cuba until his death on 22 June 1644.

== External links and additional sources ==
- Cheney, David M. "Archdiocese of Santiago de Cuba". Catholic-Hierarchy.org. (for Chronology of Bishops) ^{[self-published]}
- Chow, Gabriel. "Metropolitan Archdiocese of Santiago". GCatholic.org. (for Chronology of Bishops) ^{[self-published]}

Catholic Church titles
Preceded by Leonel de Cervantes y Caravajal	Bishop of Santiago de Cuba; 1630–1644	Succeeded by Martín de Zelaya y Oláriz
