= Sebastián de Salamanca =

Most Reverend Sebastián de Salamanca
- Bishop of Santiago de Cuba
- Church: Catholic Church
- Diocese: Diocese of Santiago de Cuba
- In office: 1525–1526
- Predecessor: Juan de Witte Hoos
- Successor: Miguel Ramírez de Salamanca

Personal details
- Died: 1526 Santiago de Cuba

Sebastián de Salamanca (died 1526) was a Roman Catholic prelate who served as Bishop of Santiago de Cuba (1525–1526).

== Biography ==
In 1525, Sebastián de Salamanca was appointed during the papacy of Pope Clement VII as Bishop of Santiago de Cuba. He served as Bishop of Santiago de Cuba until his death in 1526.

== External links and additional sources ==
- Cheney, David M. "Archdiocese of Santiago de Cuba". Catholic-Hierarchy.org. (for Chronology of Bishops) ^{[self-published]}
- Chow, Gabriel. "Metropolitan Archdiocese of Santiago". GCatholic.org. (for Chronology of Bishops) ^{[self-published]}

Catholic Church titles
Preceded by Juan de Witte Hoos	Bishop of Santiago de Cuba; 1525–1526	Succeeded by Miguel Ramírez de Salamanca
