= Martín de Zelaya y Oláriz =

Most Reverend Martín de Zelaya y Oláriz
- Bishop of Santiago de Cuba
- Church: Catholic Church
- Diocese: Diocese of Santiago de Cuba
- In office: 1645–1649
- Predecessor: Jerónimo Manrique de Lara y de Herrera
- Successor: Nicolás de la Torre Muñoz

Orders
- Consecration: 1646

Personal details
- Born: Oñate, Spain

Martín de Zelaya y Oláriz or Martín de Celaya y Oláriz was a Roman Catholic prelate who served as Bishop of Santiago de Cuba (1645–1649).

== Biography ==
Martín de Zelaya y Oláriz was born in Oñate, Spain. In 1646, he was consecrated bishop. On 20 November 1645, he was appointed during the papacy of Pope Innocent X as Bishop of Santiago de Cuba. In 1646, he was consecrated bishop. He served as Bishop of Santiago de Cuba until his resignation in 1649.

== External links and additional sources ==
- Cheney, David M. "Archdiocese of Santiago de Cuba". Catholic-Hierarchy.org. (for Chronology of Bishops) ^{[self-published]}
- Chow, Gabriel. "Metropolitan Archdiocese of Santiago". GCatholic.org. (for Chronology of Bishops) ^{[self-published]}

Catholic Church titles
| Preceded by Jerónimo Manrique de Lara y de Herrera | Bishop of Santiago de Cuba; 1645–1649 | Succeeded by Nicolás de la Torre Muñoz |
