= Geraldo Dantas de Andrade =

Brazilian priest (1931–2021)

Geraldo Dantas de Andrade (29 September 1931 – 1 May 2021) was a Brazilian Roman Catholic titular bishop and auxiliary bishop.

Dantas de Andrade was born in Brazil and was ordained to the priesthood in 1957. He served as titular bishop of Cibaliana from, and was auxiliary bishop of the Roman Catholic Archdiocese of São Luís do Maranhão, Brazil, from 1998 to 2010.
