= Larrea, Álava =

Hamlet in Álava, Spain

Larrea
- Concejo
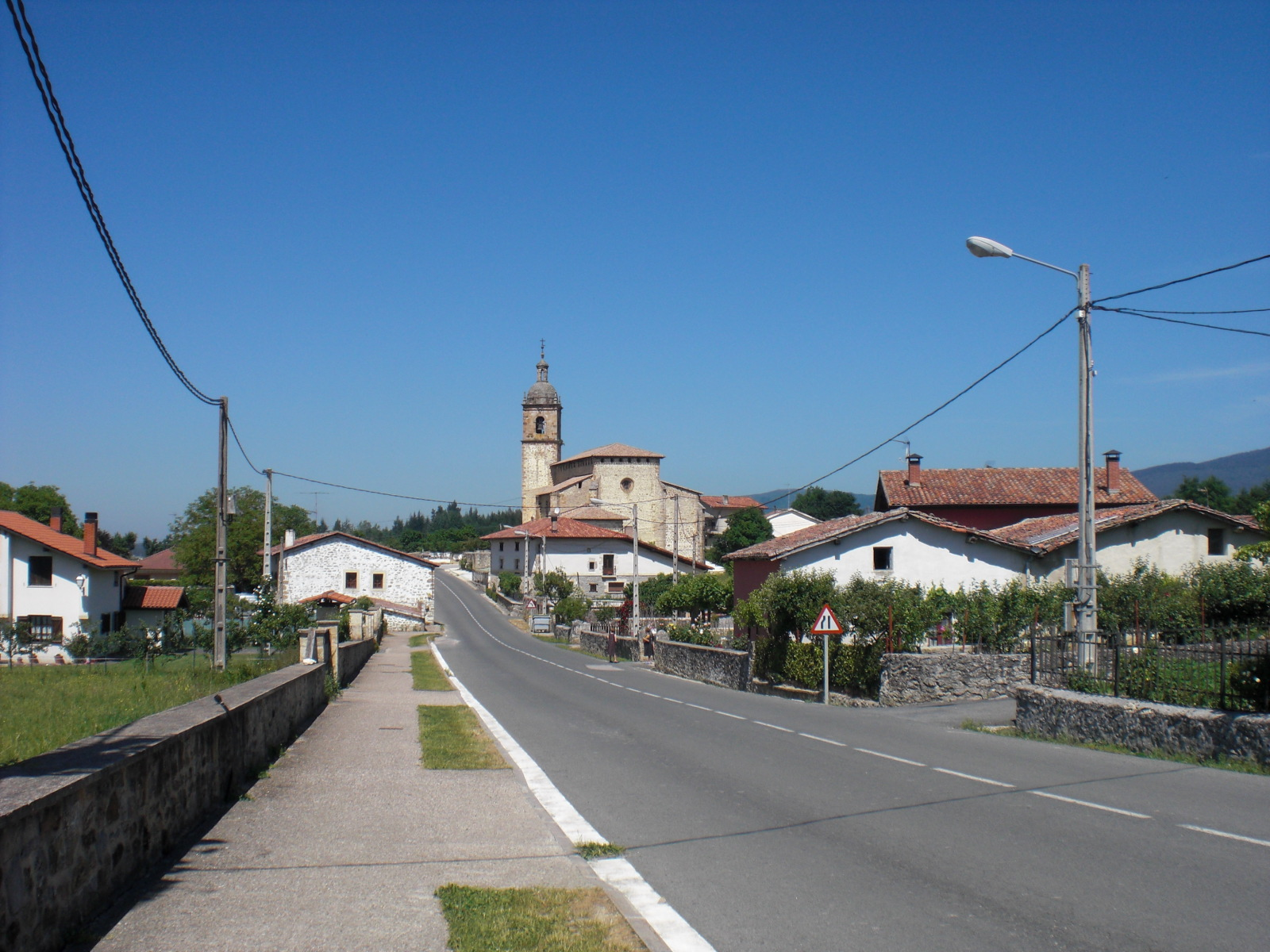
- View of the hamlet

- Location within Álava Location within the Basque Country Location within Spain
- Coordinates: 42°54′55″N 2°28′08″W
- Country: Spain
- Autonomous community: Basque Country
- Province: Álava
- Comarca: Llanada Alavesa
- Municipality: Barrundia
- Elevation: 569 m (1,867 ft)

Population (2021)
  - Total: 98
- Postal code: 01208

Larrea (Basque pronunciation: [larea], Spanish pronunciation: [laˈrea]) is a hamlet and concejo located in the municipality of Barrundia, in Álava province, Basque Country, Spain.

== Notable people ==
- Juan Pérez de Lazarraga (1548–1605), author of an early manuscript in Basque
