= Anea =

Anea can refer to:

- Anea, a Byzantine era village in Syria Palaestina
- Anea, a fictional continent in the Ace Combat game
