= Archdiocese of Santiago de Cuba =

Latin Catholic jurisdiction in Cuba

Coordinates: 20.0210°N 75.8295°W

Archdiocese of Santiago de Cuba Archidioecesis Sancti Iacobi in Cuba
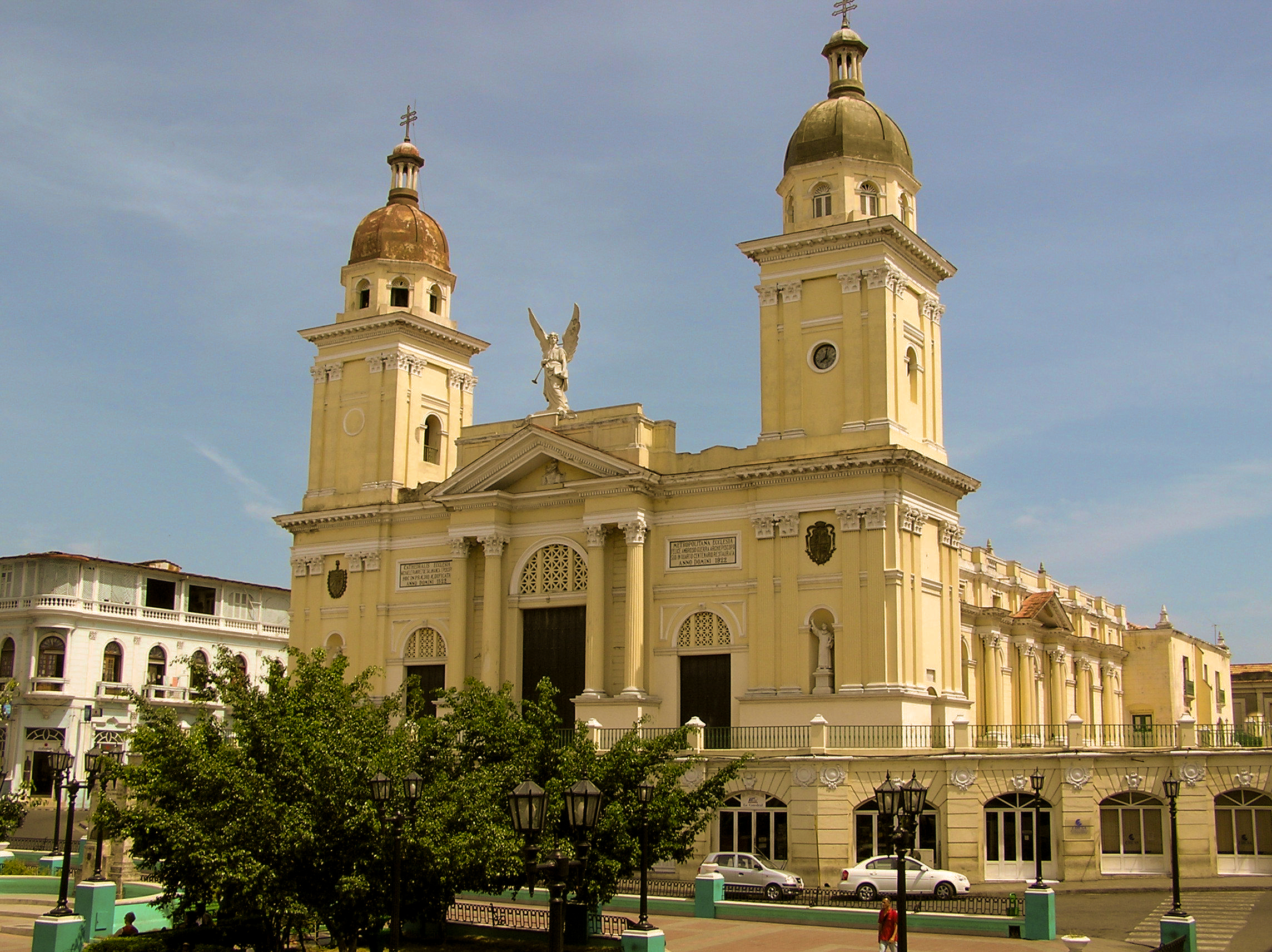
- Catedral Metropolitana de Nuestra Señora de la Asunción

Location
- Country: Cuba
- Ecclesiastical province: Province of Santiago de Cuba
- Metropolitan: Santiago de Cuba

Statistics
- Area: 6,043 km^{2} (2,333 sq mi)
- Population: Total; Catholics: (as of 2010); 1,050,000; 255,500 (24.3%)
- Parishes: 16

Information
- Denomination: Catholic Church
- Sui iuris church: Latin Church
- Rite: Roman Rite
- Established: 1518
- Cathedral: Cathedral of Our Lady of the Assumption

Current leadership
- Pope: Leo XIV
- Archbishop: Dionisio García Ibáñez

The Archdiocese of Santiago de Cuba (Latin: Archidioecesis Sancti Iacobi in Cuba) (erected 1518 as the Diocese of Baracoa) is a Latin Catholic ecclesiastical jurisdiction or archdiocese of the Catholic Church in Cuba. It is a metropolitan see with four suffragan dioceses in its ecclesiastical province: Guantánamo-Baracoa, Holguín and Santísimo Salvador de Bayamo y Manzanillo.

Prior to elevation as a archdiocese, the Diocese of Santiago de Cuba was a suffragan of the Archdiocese of Seville in Spain until 12 February 1546 when it became a suffragan of the Diocese of Santo Domingo (now Archdiocese of Santo Domingo) in the Dominican Republic. In 1803, the see was elevated to an archdiocese. The archdiocese is the home of the Basílica Santuario Nacional de Nuestra Señora de la Caridad del Cobre.

== Bishops ==
Diocese of Baracoa

Erected: 1518

- Juan de Witte Hoos, OP (1517–1525) Resigned

Diocese of Santiago de Cuba

Name Changed: 28 April 1522
Latin Name: Sancti Iacobi in Cuba

- Sebastián de Salamanca (1525–1526) Died
- Miguel Ramírez de Salamanca, OP (1530–1534) Died
- Diego de Sarmiento, OCart (1535–1544) Resigned
- Fernando de Uranga (1550–1556) Died
- Bernardino de Villalpando, CRSA (1561–1564) Appointed, Bishop of Santiago de Guatemala
- Juan del Castillo (bishop) (1564–1578) Resigned)
- Juan Antonio Diaz de Salcedo, OFM (1580–1597) Appointed, Bishop of Nicaragua)
- Bartolomé de la Plaza, OFM (1597–1602) Died
- Juan de las Cabezas Altamirano (1602–1610) Appointed, Bishop of Santiago de Guatemala
- Alonso Orozco Enriquez de Armendáriz Castellanos y Toledo, OdeM (1610–1624) Appointed, Bishop of Michoacán
- Gregorio de Alarcón, OAD (1623–1624) Died
- Leonel de Cervantes y Caravajal (1625–1629) Appointed, Bishop of Guadalajara
- Jerónimo Manrique de Lara y de Herrera, OdeM (1629–1644) Died
- Martín de Zelaya y Oláriz (1645–1649) Resigned
- Nicolás de la Torre Muñoz (1649–1653) Died
- Juan de Montiel (1655–1657) Died
- Pedro de Reina Maldonado (1659–1660) Died before he was consecrated
- Juan de Sancto Mathía Sáenz de Mañozca y Murillo (1661–1668) Appointed, Bishop of Santiago de Guatemala
- Alonso Bernardo de los Ríos y Guzmán, OSsT (1668–1671) Appointed, Bishop of Ciudad Rodrigo)
- Gabriel Díaz Vara Calderón (1671–1676) Died
- Juan Antonio García de Palacios (1677–1682) Died
- Baltasar de Figueroa, OCist (1683–1684) Died
- Diego Evelino Hurtado de Compostela (1685–1704) Died
- Jerónimo de Nosti y Valdés, OSBas (1705–1729) Died
- Francisco de Izarregui (1730) Resigned
- Gaspar de Molina y Oviedo, OSA (1730–1731) Appointed, Bishop of Barcelona
- José Laso de la Vega y Cansino, OFM (1731–1752) Died
- Pedro Agustín Morell de Santa Cruz y Lora (1753–1768) Died
- Santiago José Echaverría Nieto de Osorio y Elguera (1770–1788) Appointed, Bishop of Tlaxcala)
- Antonio Feliú y Centeno (1789–1791) Died
- Joaquín de Osés y Alzúa y Caparacio (1792–1823) Died

Archdiocese of Santiago de Cuba

Elevated: 24 November 1803

- Mariano Rodríguez de Olmedo y Valle (1824–1831) died
- Cirilo de Alameda y Brea, OFM (1831–1849) died
- St. Antonio María Claret y Clará, CMF (1850–1859)
- Manuel María Negueruela Mendi (1859–1861) died
- Primo Calvo y López (1861–1868) died
- José María Martín de Herrera y de la Iglesia (1875–1889) appointed, Archbishop of Santiago de Compostela
- José María Cos y Macho (1889–1892) appointed, Archbishop (Personal Title) of Madrid
- Francisco Sáenz de Urturi y Crespo, OFM (1894–1899) resigned
- Francisco de Paula Barnada y Aguilar (1899–1913) died
- Felix Ambrosio Guerra, SDB (1915–1925) Resigned
- Valentín Zubizarreta y Unamunsaga, OCD (1925–1948) died
- Enrique Pérez Serantes (1948–1968) died
- Pedro Claro Meurice Estiu (1970–2007) retired
- Dionisio García Ibáñez (Dionisio Guillermo García Ibáñez) (2007–present)

=== Auxiliary bishops ===
- Dionisio Resino (Rezino) y Ormachea, OSB (1705–1711)
- José Francisco Martínez de Tejada y Díez de Velasco, OFM (1732–1745), appointed Bishop of Yucatán (Mérida), México
- Pedro Ponce y Carrasco (1746–1762), appointed Bishop of Quito, Ecuador
- Santiago José Hechavarría y Elguesúa (1768–1769), appointed Bishop here
- Francisco Antonio Pablo Sieni Flannings, OFMCap (1784–1787), appointed Auxiliary Bishop of San Cristobal de la Habana
- Pedro Claro Meurice Estiu (1967–1970), appointed Archbishop here
- Héctor Luis Lucas Peña Gómez (1970–1979), appointed Bishop of Holguín

=== Other priests of this diocese who became bishops ===
- Luis Ignatius Peñalver y Cárdenas, appointed Bishop of Louisiana and the Two Floridas (Saint Louis of New Orleans), USA in 1794
- Carlos Riu Anglés, appointed Bishop of Camagüey in 1948
- Francisco Ricardo Oves Fernández, appointed Auxiliary Bishop of Cienfuegos in 1969
- Carlos Jesús Patricio Baladrón Valdés, appointed Auxiliary Bishop of San Cristobal de la Habana in 1991
- Silvano Herminio Pedroso Montalvo, appointed Bishop of Guantánamo-Baracoa in 2018

== Territorial losses ==
Year	Along with	To form
1787		Diocese of San Cristóbal de la Habana
1912		Diocese of Camagüey
1979		Diocese of Holguín
1995		Diocese of Santísimo Salvador de Bayamo y Manzanillo
1998		Diocese of Guantánamo-Baracoa

The see also gained territory in 1527 with the suppression of the Diocese of Concepción de la Vega.

== External links and references ==
- "Archdiocese of Santiago de Cuba". Catholic-Hierarchy.
- Havana puts on New Face for Pope by Phillip True, Express News, January 21, 1998
