= Diocese of Guantánamo-Baracoa =

Latin Catholic diocese in Cuba

Coordinates: 20.1434°N 75.2034°W

Diocese of Guantánamo-Baracoa Dioecesis Guantanamensis-Baracoensis
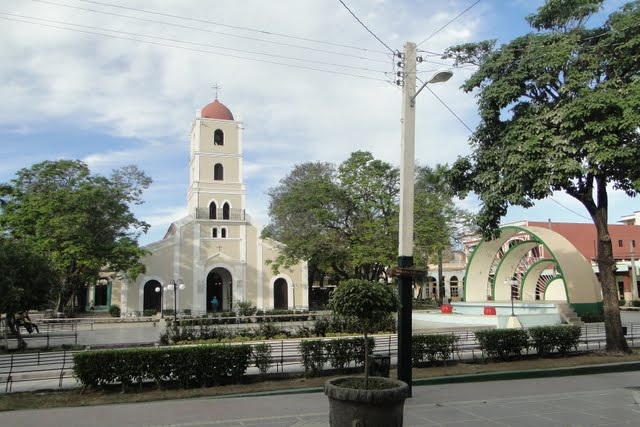
- Catedral Santa Catalina de Ricci

Location
- Country: Cuba
- Ecclesiastical province: Province of Santiago de Cuba
- Metropolitan: Guantánamo

Statistics
- Area: 6,565 km^{2} (2,535 sq mi)
- Population: Total; Catholics: (as of 2006); 511,156; 185,218 (36.2%)
- Parishes: 7

Information
- Denomination: Catholic Church
- Sui iuris church: Latin Church
- Rite: Roman Rite
- Established: 24 January 1998 (28 years ago)
- Cathedral: St. Catherine of Ricci Cathedral
- Co-cathedral: Our Lady of the Assumption Co-Cathedral, Baracoa

Current leadership
- Pope: Leo XIV
- Bishop: vacant

Website
- www.guantanamo.org

The Diocese of Guantánamo-Baracoa is a particular church of the Latin Church of the Catholic Church, encompassing the municipality of Baracoa and the surrounding Guantánamo Province in Cuba. It was erected 24 January 1998 from the Archdiocese of Santiago de Cuba, to which it is suffragan

== Ordinaries ==
- Carlos Jesús Patricio Baladrón Valdés (1998 - 2006) - Bishop Emeritus
- Wilfredo Pino Estévez (2006 - 2016), appointed Archbishop of Camagüey
- Silvano Herminio Pedroso Montalvo (2018 - 2026)
