= Diocese of Cienfuegos =

Latin Catholic diocese in Cuba

Coordinates: 22.1461°N 80.4519°W

Diocese of Cienfuegos Dioecesis Centumfocencis
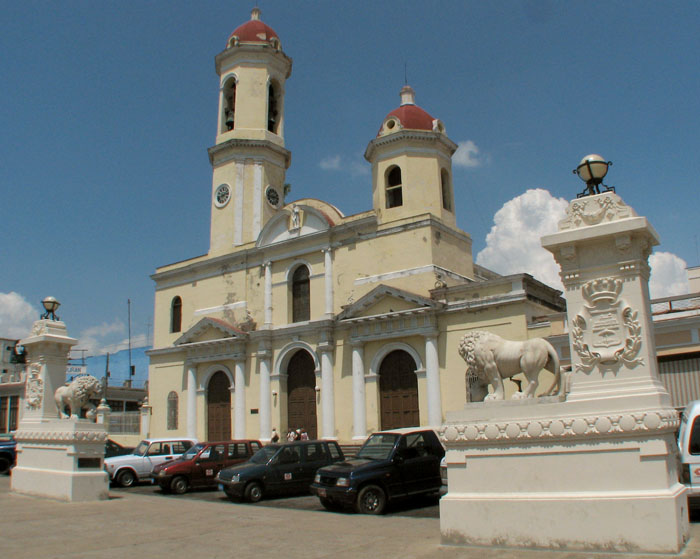
- Catedral de Nuestra Señora de la Purísima Concepción

Location
- Country: Cuba
- Ecclesiastical province: Camagüey
- Metropolitan: Cienfuegos

Statistics
- Area: 5,360 km^{2} (2,070 sq mi)
- Population: Total; Catholics: (as of 2006); 485,000; 293,600 (60.5%)
- Parishes: 22

Information
- Denomination: Catholic Church
- Sui iuris church: Latin Church
- Rite: Roman Rite
- Established: 20 February 1903 (123 years ago)
- Cathedral: Cathedral of Our Lady of the Immaculate Conception

Current leadership
- Pope: Leo XIV
- Bishop: Domingo Oropesa Lorente

Map

The Diocese of Cienfuegos is a suffragan diocese of the Archdiocese of Camagüey. The original Diocese of Cienfuegos was erected in 1903 and renamed as the Diocese of Cienfuegos-Santa Clara in 1971. That diocese was split in 1995 to form the Dioceses of Cienfuegos and Santa Clara.

== Bishops ==
=== Ordinaries ===
- Antonio Aurelio Torres y Sanz, OCD (1904 - 1916)
- Valentín Zubizarreta y Unamunsaga, OCD (1922 - 1925), appointed Archbishop of Santiago de Cuba
- Eduardo Pedro Martínez y Dalmau, CP (1935 - 1961)
- Alfredo Antonio Francisco Müller y San Martín (1961 - 1971)
- Fernando Ramon Prego Casal (1971 - 1995)
- Emilio Aranguren Echeverria (1995 - 2005)
- Domingo Oropesa Lorente (since 2007)

=== Auxiliary bishops ===
- Francisco Ricardo Oves Fernández (1969-1970), appointed Archbishop of San Cristobal de la Habana
- Fernando Ramon Prego Casal (1969-1970), appointed Bishop here
- Emilio Aranguren Echeverria (1991-1995), appointed Bishop here

=== Other priest of this diocese who became bishop ===
- Marcelo Arturo González Amador, appointed Auxiliary Bishop of Santa Clara in 1998

== External links and references ==
- "Diocese of Cienfuegos". Catholic-Hierarchy.
