= Juan García Rodríguez =

Cuban prelate of the Catholic Church

His Eminence Juan García Rodríguez
- Metropolitan Archbishop of San Cristóbal de la Habana
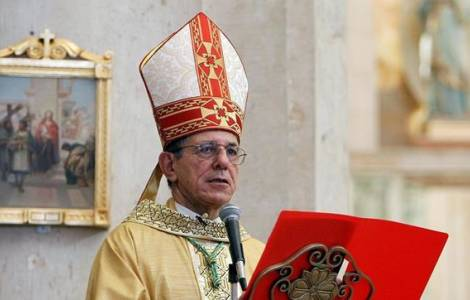
- García Rodríguez in mid-2016.
- Church: Catholic Church
- Archdiocese: San Cristóbal de la Habana
- See: San Cristóbal de la Habana
- Appointed: 26 April 2016
- Installed: 22 May 2016
- Predecessor: Jaime Lucas Ortega y Alamino
- Other post: Cardinal-Priest of Santi Aquila e Priscilla (2019-)
- Previous posts: Titular Bishop of Gummi in Proconsulari (1997-2002); Auxiliary Bishop of Camagüey (1997-2002); Archbishop of Camagüey (2002-2016); President of the Cuban Bishops' Conference (2007-09)

Orders
- Ordination: 25 January 1972 by Adolfo Rodríguez Herrera
- Consecration: 7 June 1997 by Adolfo Rodríguez Herrera
- Created cardinal: 5 October 2019 by Pope Francis
- Rank: Cardinal-Priest

Personal details
- Born: Juan de la Caridad García Rodríguez; 11 July 1948 (age 78) Camagüey, Cuba
- Motto: Ve y anuncia el Evangelio (Go and preach the Gospel)
- Coat of arms

Styles of Juan Garcia Rodriguez
- Reference style: The Most Reverend
- Spoken style: Your Excellency
- Religious style: Archbishop
- Informal style: Cardinal

Juan de la Caridad García Rodríguez (born 11 July 1948) is a Cuban prelate of the Catholic Church who has served as Archbishop of Havana since 26 April 2016. He previously served as an Auxiliary Bishop of Camagüey from 1997 to 2002 and then as archbishop of that diocese from 2002 to 2016. He is a past president of the Cuban Conference of Catholic Bishops. Pope Francis raised him to the rank of cardinal on 5 October 2019.

== Biography ==
He was born in Camagüey on 11 July 1948. He was a member of the first group of Cuban priests to be educated entirely in Cuba. He studied at Saint Basil the Great Seminary in El Cobre, Santiago de Cuba, and then at Saints Charles and Ambrose Seminary (now the Father Felix Varela Cultural Center) in Havana. He was ordained a priest on 25 January 1972. In the years after his ordination he worked in parishes that are now part of the Ciego de Ávila Diocese.

In March 1997 he was named auxiliary bishop of Camagüey and was consecrated bishop in Camagüey's Our Lady of Mercy Church on 7 June 1997 by Adolfo Rodríguez Herrera, the bishop of Camagüey. He chose as his episcopal motto "Go and announce the Gospel". Camagüey became an archdiocese in late 1998 and he was named to succeed Herrera as archbishop in February 2002. He developed evangelization programs in which grandparents, who still remembered their education in Catholicism as children, taught the principles of Catholicism to their grandchildren. He also, with government permission, established prison ministries.

García Rodríguez was the president of the First National Missions Assembly in Havana in 2006. He was elected president of the Cuban Conference of Catholic Bishops in 2006 and served until 2010. He represented Cuba at the fifth general assembly of Latin American and Caribbean bishops in Aparecida, Brazil, in 2007, which ended with the promulgation of the Declaration of Aparecida drafted by Cardinal Bergoglio of Buenos Aires (later Pope Francis). The Vatican named him a member of the Pontifical Council for Justice and Peace in February 2007.

He participated in the 2014 sessions of the Synod on the Family.

On 26 April 2016, Pope Francis named him Archbishop of Havana to succeed Cardinal Jaime Lucas Ortega y Alamino who is a Cuban prelate of the Catholic Church. Granma, the newspaper of the Communist Party of Cuba, reported his appointment. He was installed on 22 May.

On 5 October 2019, Pope Francis made him Cardinal-Priest of Santi Aquila e Priscilla. He was made a member of the Congregation for the Clergy on 21 February 2020 and of the Pontifical Commission for Latin America on 20 April 2020.

He participated as a cardinal elector in the 2025 papal conclave that elected Pope Leo XIV.

== See also ==
- Cardinals created by Francis

Catholic Church titles
Preceded by Mario Eusebio Mestril Vega	Auxiliary Bishop of Camagüey; 15 March 1997 – 10 June 2002	Vacant
Preceded by Horacio del Carmen Valenzuela Abarca	— TITULAR — Titular Bishop of Gummi in Proconsulari; 15 March 1997 – 10 June 2002	Succeeded by Markos Ghebremedhin
Preceded by Adolfo Rodríguez Herrera	Archbishop of Camagüey; 10 June 2002 – 26 April 2016	Succeeded by Wilfredo Pino Estévez
Preceded by Jaime Lucas Ortega y Alamino	President of the Cuban Episcopal Conference; April 2007 – 29 March 2009	Succeeded by Dionisio Guillermo García Ibáñez
Preceded by Jaime Lucas Ortega y Alamino	Archbishop of La Habana; 26 April 2016 –	Incumbent
Preceded by Jaime Lucas Ortega y Alamino	Cardinal-Priest of Santi Aquila e Priscilla; 5 October 2019 –	Incumbent
