= Jaime Lucas Ortega y Alamino =

Cuban prelate (1936–2019)

His Eminence Jaime Lucas Ortega y Alamino
- Cardinal, Archbishop emeritus of San Cristobal de la Habana
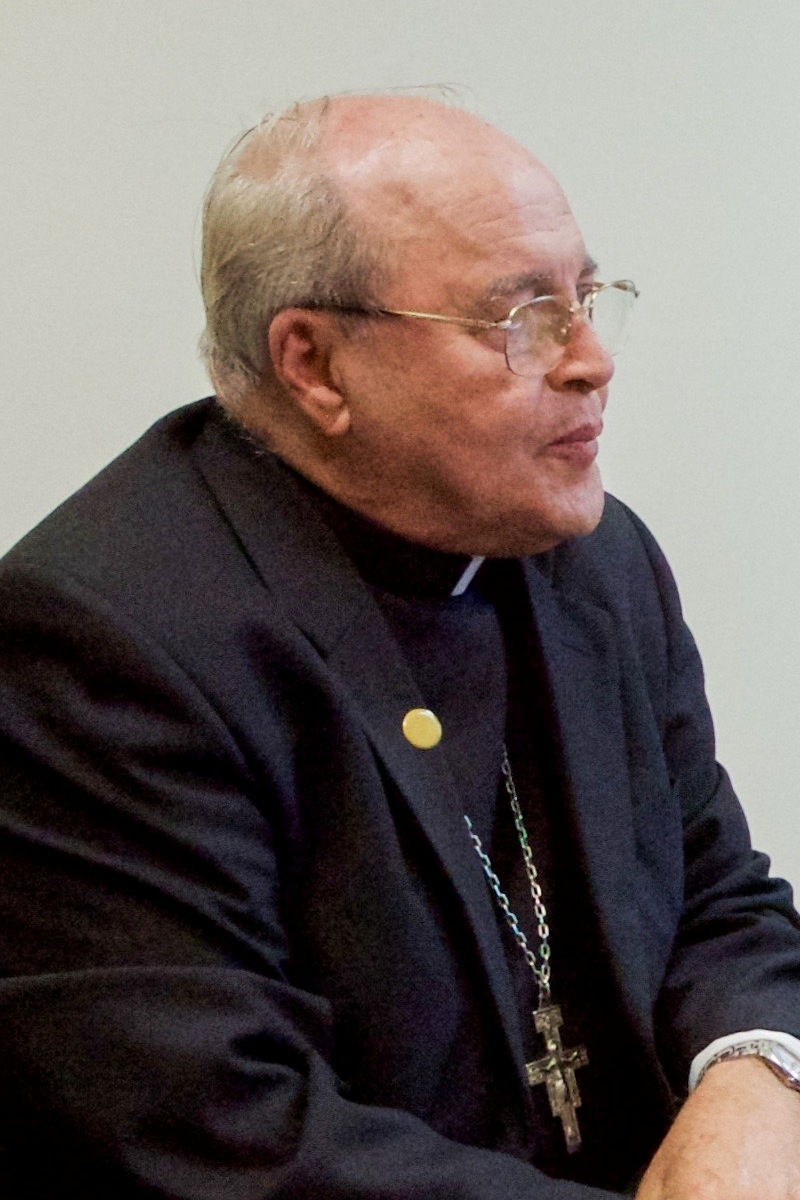
- Church: Roman Catholic Church
- Diocese: San Cristóbal de la Habana
- Appointed: 21 November 1981
- Term ended: 26 April 2016
- Predecessor: Francisco Ricardo Oves Fernández
- Successor: Juan de la Caridad Garcia Rodriguez
- Other post: Cardinal Priest of Santi Aquila e Priscilla
- Previous post: Bishop of Pinar del Río (1979–1981)

Orders
- Ordination: 2 August 1964 by José Maximino Eusebio Domínguez y Rodríguez
- Consecration: 14 January 1979 by Mario Tagliaferri
- Created cardinal: 26 November 1994 by Pope John Paul II
- Rank: Cardinal priest

Personal details
- Born: Jaime Lucas Ortega y Alamino; 18 October 1936 Jagüey Grande, Cuba
- Died: 26 July 2019 (aged 82) La Habana, Cuba, Cuba
- Denomination: Catholic
- Motto: Sufficit tibi gratia mea ('My grace is sufficient for you'; 2 Corinthians 12:9)
- Coat of arms

Styles of Jaime Lucas Ortega y Alamino
- Reference style: His Eminence
- Spoken style: Your Eminence
- Informal style: Cardinal
- See: San Cristobal de la Habana

Jaime Lucas Ortega y Alamino (18 October 1936 – 26 July 2019) was a Cuban prelate of the Catholic Church who served as Archbishop of Havana from 1981 to 2016. He was appointed to the College of Cardinals in 1994, the second Cuban to hold that distinction.

== Early life and ordination ==
Ortega was born on 18 October 1936 in Jagüey Grande, Matanzas, Cuba. He studied for the priesthood at the Seminary of San Alberto Magno in Matanzas and at the Seminary of Foreign Missions in Laval, Quebec, Canada. He was ordained a priest on 2 August 1964 by Bishop José Domínguez Rodríguez of Matanzas. He was assigned to various parishes in the Diocese of Matanzas from 1964 to 1966. Ortega was imprisoned by the Communist government from 1966 to 1967.

From 1967 to 1969, Ortega was pastor of Jagüey Grande, his native city; like all the pastors in Cuba, due to a severe shortage of priests in those years, he served in several parishes and churches at the same time. He was also pastor of the cathedral of Matanzas, and at the same time, assisted the parish of Pueblo Nuevo and two other churches in the countryside; he was also president of the diocesan commission for catechesis and created an active apostolate with the youth of the diocese. In those years, which were even more difficult for the pastoral work of the church, he began a youth movement that included, among other forms of apostolate, a summer camp for the youth, and a work of evangelization through theatrical works performed by them.

At the same time, he was a professor at San Carlos y San Ambrosio Interdiocesan Seminary, Havana, where for several years he traveled every week to teach moral theology.

== Bishop, archbishop and cardinal ==
On 4 December 1978, Pope John Paul II named him Bishop of the Diocese of Pinar del Río. He was consecrated bishop on 14 January 1979 by Mario Tagliaferri, Pro-Nuncio in Cuba, assisted by Francisco Oves-Fernandez, Archbishop of Havana, as well as José Domínguez Rodríguez, Bishop of Matanzas. He chose as his episcopal motto Sufficit tibi gratia mea, meaning 'My grace is sufficient for you', taken from (2 Corinthians 12:9).

He was appointed archbishop of Havana in 1981 and, on 26 November 1994, was made Cardinal Priest of Santi Aquila e Priscilla. He served as the president of the Conference of Catholic Bishops of Cuba from 1988 to 1999 and again from 2001 to 2007.

Ortega y Alamino was one of the cardinal electors in the 2005 papal conclave that elected Pope Benedict XVI and one of those who in the 2013 papal conclave elected Pope Francis.

On 15 June 2013, Pope Francis named Cardinal Ortega y Alamino as his special envoy to the closing ceremony of the National Eucharistic Congress in El Salvador, scheduled for 11 August 2013. On 26 April 2016, Pope Francis accepted his resignation as archbishop.

== Death ==
Ortega was diagnosed with pancreatic cancer in 2018. He died on 26 July 2019. Masses honoring the life of Ortega were held between 26 July and 28 July, and his funeral was held in the Havana Cathedral on 28 July. First vice-president Salvador Valdes Mesa, vice-president Roberto Morales, and Esteban Lazo, the head of the Cuban National Assembly, joined other Cuban government and Communist Party officials in attendance. Cuban President Miguel Diaz-Canel and former president, and also then-Cuban Communist Party leader, Raúl Castro, did not attend, but sent bouquets of flowers. Religious leaders from other nations, such as Miami Archbishop Thomas Wenski, Puerto Rico Archbishop Roberto Gonzalez Nieves and Cardinal Sean Patrick O'Malley of Boston, also attended Ortega's funeral. Ortega was afterwards buried in the Colon Cemetery in Havana.

== Awards ==
In 2004, the Institution of Humanitarian Merit in Barcelona awarded him the "Gran Cruz al Mérito Humanitario". He held honorary degrees from the University of Saint Thomas, Fordham University, Barry University, University of San Francisco, Providence College, Boston College, St. John's University, Universidad Popular Autónoma del Estado de Puebla, and Creighton University.

== Views ==
Ortega y Alamino was critical of both capitalism and communism. Like John Paul II, he urged his nation not to construct a post-communist future on the basis of hyper-capitalist principles. In 1998, he warned of the insidious influence in Cuba of a "species of American subculture that invades everything: It is a fashion, a conception of life." In September 1993 the Cuban Conference of Catholic Bishops, headed by Cardinal Ortega, published the message "El amor todo lo espera" ('Love endures all things'), extremely critical of the Cuban Communist government (for which he could have been imprisoned) and asking for a new direction of the country. In April 2010 he said that Cuba was in crisis.

== Political activism ==
On 20 May 2010, Dionisio García Ibáñez, Archbishop of Santiago de Cuba, and Cardinal Ortega met with Cuban President Raúl Castro to discuss issues concerning jailed political dissidents. Ortega said that there "will be a process and this process has to start with small steps and these steps will be made." The high-level meeting followed by a press conference was unusual. Cardinal Ortega met with U.S. Secretary of State John Kerry on 14 August 2015, prior to Kerry's visit with the Cuban Minister of Foreign Affairs, Bruno Rodriguez; after visiting Kerry, Ortega stated that the situation was improving.

During negotiations to renew diplomatic relations between the United States and Cuba, Cardinal Ortega, without public announcement, visited the White House and hand-delivered a letter from Pope Francis to President Obama.

Catholic Church titles
Preceded by Francisco Oves-Fernandez	Archbishop of Havana; 1981–2016	Succeeded by Juan Garcia Rodriguez
