= Archdiocese of Camagüey =

Latin Catholic archdiocese in Cuba

Coordinates: 21.3827°N 77.9164°W

Archdiocese of Camagüey Archidioecesis Camagueyensis
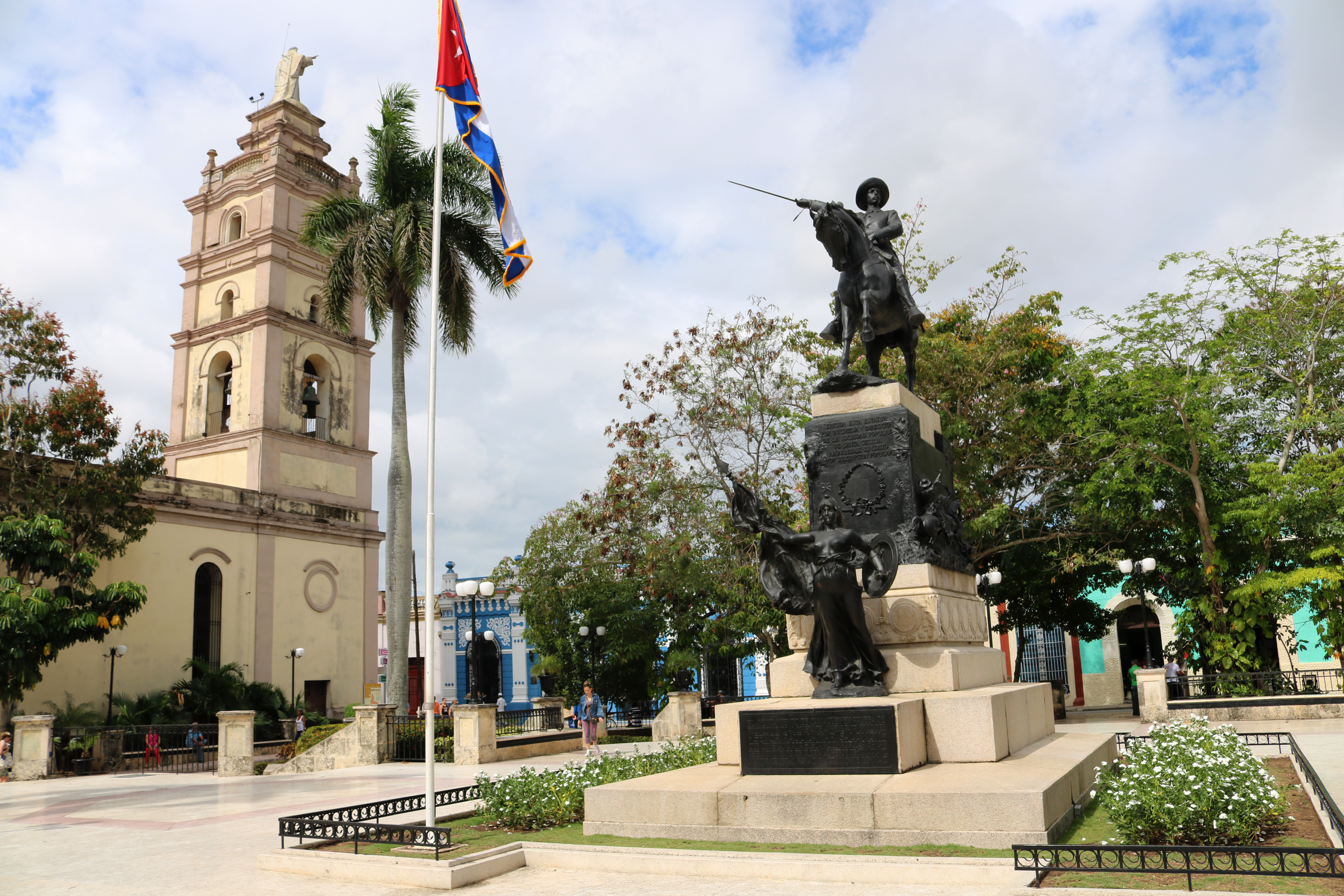
- Cathedral of Our Lady of Candelaria

Location
- Country: Cuba
- Ecclesiastical province: Province of Camagüey
- Metropolitan: Camagüey

Statistics
- Area: 18,671 km^{2} (7,209 sq mi)
- Population: Total; Catholics: (as of 2006); 861,372; 544,000 (63.2%)
- Parishes: 14

Information
- Denomination: Catholic Church
- Sui iuris church: Latin Church
- Rite: Roman Rite
- Established: 10 December 1912 (113 years ago)
- Cathedral: Cathedral of Our Lady of Candelaria

Current leadership
- Pope: Leo XIV
- Archbishop: Juan García-Rodríguez

Map

The Archdiocese of Camagüey (erected 1912 as the Diocese of Camagüey, elevated 1998) is a Metropolitan Archdiocese, responsible for the dioceses of Ciego de Avila, Cienfuegos and Santa Clara.

== Ordinaries ==
- Valentín Zubizarreta y Unamunsaga, OCD (1914–1922), appointed Bishop of Cienfuegos
- Enrique Pérez-Serantes (1922–1948), appointed Archbishop of Santiago de Cuba
- Carlos Riu-Anglés (1948–1964)
- Adolfo Rodríguez-Herrera (1964–2002)
- Juan García-Rodríguez (2002–2016), appointed Archbishop of San Cristobal de la Habana; elevated to Cardinal in 2019
- Wilfredo Pino Estévez (2016–)

=== Auxiliary bishops ===
- Adolfo Rodríguez Herrera (1963–1964), appointed Bishop here
- Mario Eusebio Mestril Vega (1991–1996), appointed Bishop of Ciego de Ávila
- Juan García-Rodríguez (1997–2002), appointed Archbishop here; future Cardinal

=== Other priests of this diocese who became bishops ===
- Álvaro Julio Beyra Luarca, appointed Bishop of Santisimo Salvador de Bayamo y Manzanillo in 2007
- Juan Gabriel Díaz Ruiz, appointed Bishop of Ciego de Ávila in 2017
