= Pedro Claro Meurice Estiu =

Pedro Claro Meurice Estiú
- Archbishop of Santiago de Cuba
- Church: Catholic Church
- Archdiocese: Archdiocese of Santiago de Cuba
- In office: July 4, 1970 – February 10, 2007
- Predecessor: Enrique Pérez Serantes
- Successor: Dionisio García Ibáñez
- Previous posts: Titular Bishop of Teglata in Numidia (1967-1970); Auxiliary Bishop of Santiago de Cuba (1967-1970)

Orders
- Ordination: June 26, 1955
- Consecration: August 30, 1967 by Enrique Pérez Serantes

Personal details
- Born: February 23, 1932 San Luis, Oriente Province, Cuba
- Died: July 21, 2011 (aged 79) Miami, Florida, United States

Pedro Claro Meurice Estiu (February 23, 1932 - July 21, 2011) was a Cuban Roman Catholic bishop who was archbishop of the Archbishop of Santiago de Cuba.

Ordained to the priesthood on June 26, 1955, he studied canon law at the Pontifical Gregorian University in Rome. When he returned to Cuba in October 1958, he was named vice chancellor and secretary to the Archbishop of Santiago de Cuba, Enrique Perez-Serantes. Meurice Estiu was appointed auxiliary bishop of the Archdiocese of Santiago de Cuba and Titular Bishop of Teglata in Numidia in 1967 by Pope Paul VI. On July 4, 1970, he was appointed archbishop and retired in 2007.

In 2011, he traveled to Miami for treatment of a diabetic condition, where he died on July 21 at Mercy Hospital.
