= Gabriel Antonio Camilo González =

Dominican Roman Catholic prelate (1938–2026)

- Bishop Emeritus of La Vega
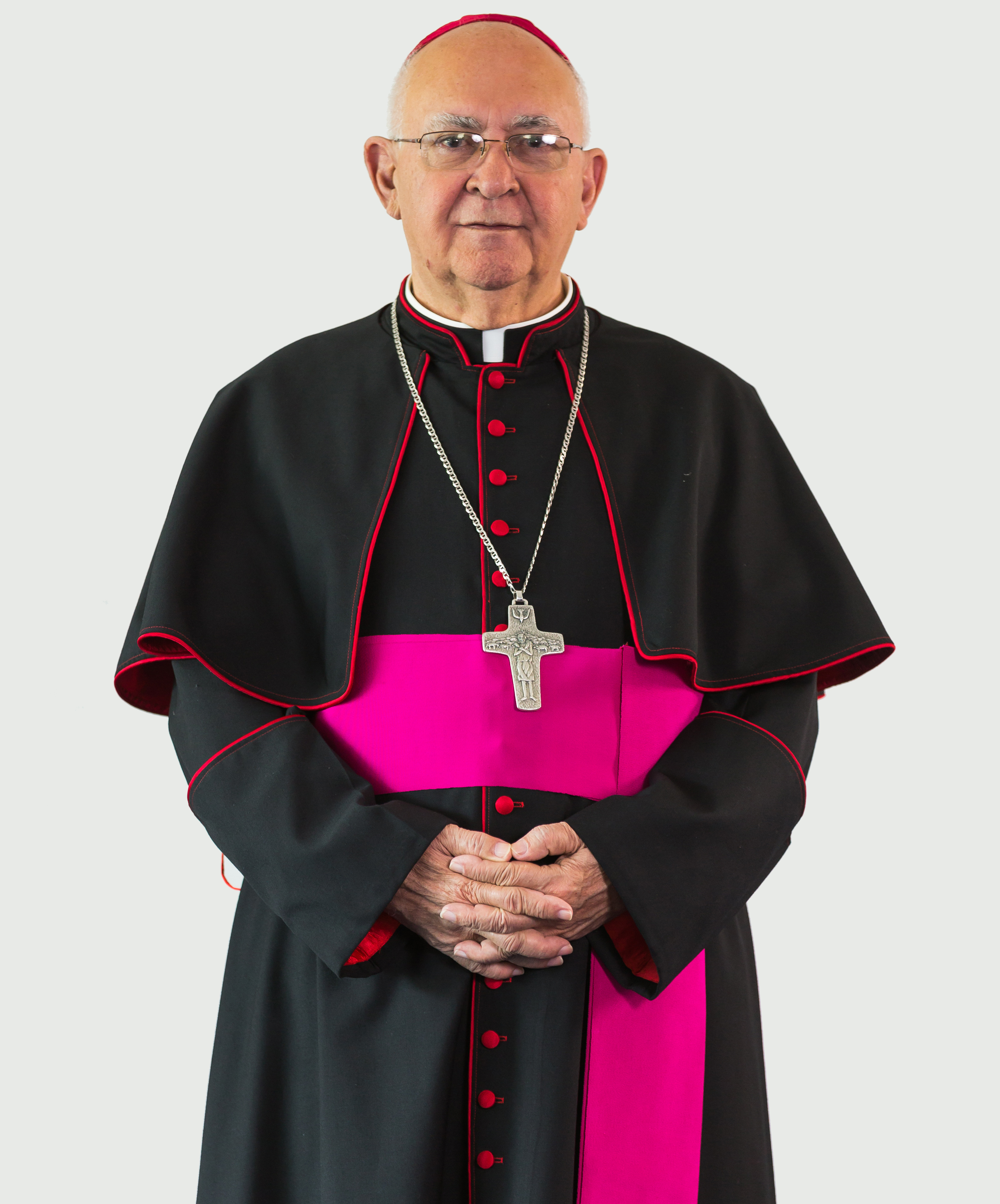
- Camilo González in 2014
- Archdiocese: Santiago de los Caballeros
- Diocese: La Vega
- Appointed: 10 October 1992
- Term ended: 23 February 2025
- Predecessor: Juan Antonio Flores Santana
- Successor: Héctor Rafael Rodríguez Rodríguez
- Other post: Chaplain of His Holiness (1987–1992)

Orders
- Ordination: 1 June 1962 by Octavio Beras Rojas
- Consecration: 8 December 1992 by Nicolás de Jesús López Rodríguez, Hugo Eduardo Polanco Brito and Juan Antonio Flores Santana

Personal details
- Born: Gabriel Antonio Rafael Camilo González; 7 February 1938 Salcedo, Dominican Republic
- Died: 16 July 2026 (aged 88) Santiago de los Caballeros, Dominican Republic
- Education: University of Buenos Aires; Pontifical University of Salamanca
- Motto: Vince In Bono Malum
- Coat of arms

Styles of Gabriel Antonio Camilo González
- Reference style: His Excellency; The Most Reverend
- Spoken style: Your Excellency
- Religious style: Bishop

Gabriel Antonio Rafael Camilo González (7 February 1938 – 17 July 2026) was a Dominican Roman Catholic prelate. He served as bishop of the Roman Catholic Diocese of La Vega from 1992 to 2015.

Camilo González died in Santiago de los Caballeros on 17 July 2026, at the age of 88.

Catholic Church titles
Preceded by Juan Antonio Flores Santana	Bishop of La Vega; 1992–2025	Succeeded by Héctor Rafael Rodríguez Rodríguez
