= Jesús María de Jesús Moya =

Dominican Republic Roman Catholic bishop (1934–2026)

The Most Reverend Jesús María de Jesús Moya
- Bishop of San Francisco de Macorís
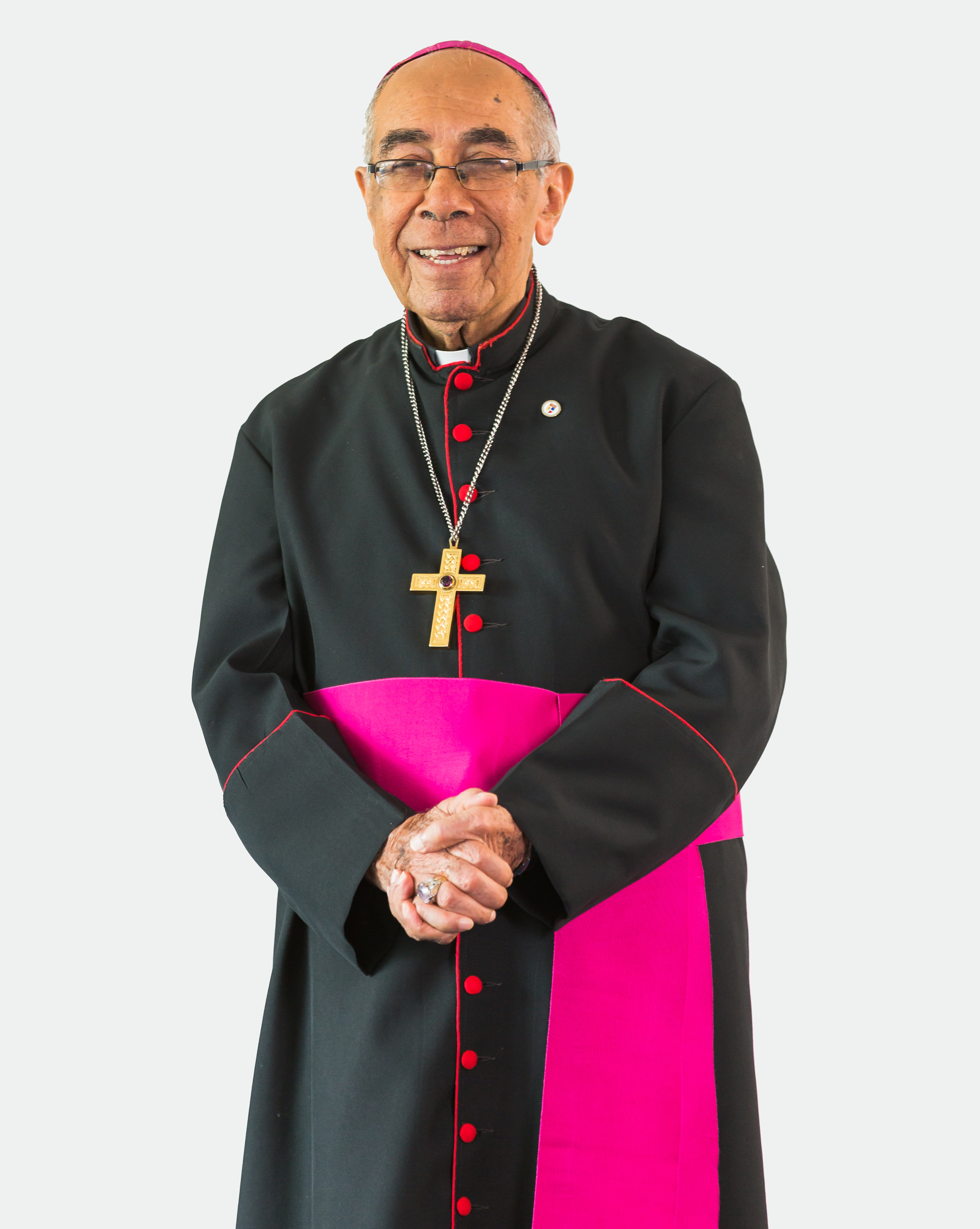
- Church: Roman Catholic Church
- Archdiocese: Santiago de los Caballeros
- Diocese: San Francisco de Macorís
- Appointed: 20 April 1984
- Term ended: 31 May 2012
- Predecessor: Nicolás de Jesús López Rodríguez
- Successor: Fausto Ramón Mejía Vallejo
- Other posts: Titular Bishop of Maxita and Auxiliary Bishop of Santiago de los Caballeros (1977–1984)

Orders
- Ordination: 18 March 1961 by Hugo Eduardo Polanco Brito
- Consecration: 21 May 1977 by Juan Antonio Flores Santana, Roque Antonio Adames Rodríguez and Hugo Eduardo Polanco Brito

Personal details
- Born: 28 November 1934 Sabana Angosta, Villa Tapia, Dominican Republic
- Died: 4 November 2026 (aged 91) San Francisco de Macorís, Dominican Republic
- Education: Saint Thomas Aquinas Pontifical Seminary
- Motto: Siempre con la Iglesia
- Coat of arms: Jesús María de Jesús Moya's coat of arms

Jesús María de Jesús Moya (28 November 1934 – 4 November 2026) was a Dominican Roman Catholic prelate who served as the bishop of the Diocese of San Francisco de Macorís from 1984 until his retirement in 2012. He previously served as an auxiliary bishop of the Diocese of Santiago de los Caballeros from 1977 to 1984.

Jesús Moya was appointed auxiliary bishop of Santiago de los Caballeros by Pope Paul VI in April 1977 and received episcopal consecration the following month. In April 1984, Pope John Paul II appointed him bishop of San Francisco de Macorís, where he served for 28 years. Pope Benedict XVI accepted his resignation from the pastoral governance of the diocese on 31 May 2012.

== Early life and education ==
Jesús María de Jesús Moya was born on 28 November 1934 (Note: In some sources, his year of birth is given as 1931, and also as 1932.) in Sabana Angosta, a settlement in Villa Tapia, then part of La Vega Province in the Dominican Republic. His parents were Gil de Jesús and Nicolasina Moya. He was raised in a Catholic family and received his early education in his hometown.

On 27 September 1950, at the age of 15, he entered the Pontifical Seminary of Santo Tomás de Aquino, where he studied humanities, philosophy and theology in preparation for the priesthood. He pursued postgraduate studies in Madrid, Spain, from 1967 to 1968, and in Quito, Ecuador, from 1970 to 1971.

== Priesthood ==
Jesus Moya was ordained a priest on 18 March 1961 at the Cathedral of Santiago Apóstol in Santiago de los Caballeros by Bishop Hugo Eduardo Polanco Brito, the first bishop of Santiago.

Following his ordination, he made various pastoral and educational responsibilities. He served as a parish vicar at the Cathedral of Santiago Apóstol and as chaplain of the Politécnico Nuestra Señora de las Mercedes and the Escuela Normal Superior Emilio Prud’Homme. He also served as a parish priest in Imbert, Puerto Plata Province.

On 9 October 1962, he was appointed vice-rector of the San Pío X Minor Seminary in Licey al Medio, Santiago Province. In 1966, he became its rector and also served as a parish vicar at the Sacred Heart of Jesus Church in the same community. He was also involved in the activities of the Latin American Episcopal Council (CELAM).

== Episcopal career ==
=== Auxiliary Bishop of Santiago de los Caballeros ===
On 13 April 1977, Pope Paul VI appointed Jesus Moya titular bishop of Maxita and auxiliary bishop of the Diocese of Santiago de los Caballeros. He received episcopal consecration on 21 May 1977. During his ministry in Santiago, he was involved in pastoral activities and diocesan administration.

=== Bishop of San Francisco de Macorís ===
On 20 April 1984, Pope John Paul II appointed Jesus Moya bishop of San Francisco de Macorís, succeeding Nicolás de Jesús López Rodríguez. He took canonical possession of the diocese on 5 May 1984.

During his 28-year episcopate, Jesus Moya was involved in the pastoral, educational and social development of the northeastern region of the Dominican Republic. His work included supporting Catholic education, priestly formation and the activities of the local Church. He also served as military vicar general in 1993.

=== Retirement ===
On 31 May 2012, Pope Benedict XVI accepted Jesus Moya's resignation from the pastoral governance of the Diocese of San Francisco de Macorís, in accordance with the provisions of canon law concerning the retirement of diocesan bishops. He was succeeded by Fausto Ramón Mejía Vallejo and retained the title of bishop emeritus.

== Death ==
Jesus Moya died in San Francisco de Macorís on 4 November 2026, at the age of 91.

== Notes ==
Catholic Church titles
Preceded by Nicolás de Jesús López Rodríguez	Bishop of San Francisco de Macorís; 1984–2012	Succeeded by Fausto Ramón Mejía Vallejo
Preceded by Joseph Lawson Howze	Titular Bishop of Maxita; 1977–1984	Succeeded by Michael Patrick Driscoll
Preceded by —	Auxiliary Bishop of Santiago de los Caballeros; 1977–1984	Succeeded by —
