= Diocese of Maxita =

Roman Catholic titular see

The Diocese of Maxita (Massita in curiate Italian) is a bishopric in Algeria. It was a Roman Catholic Church diocese in the Roman province of Africa Proconsulare.

== History ==
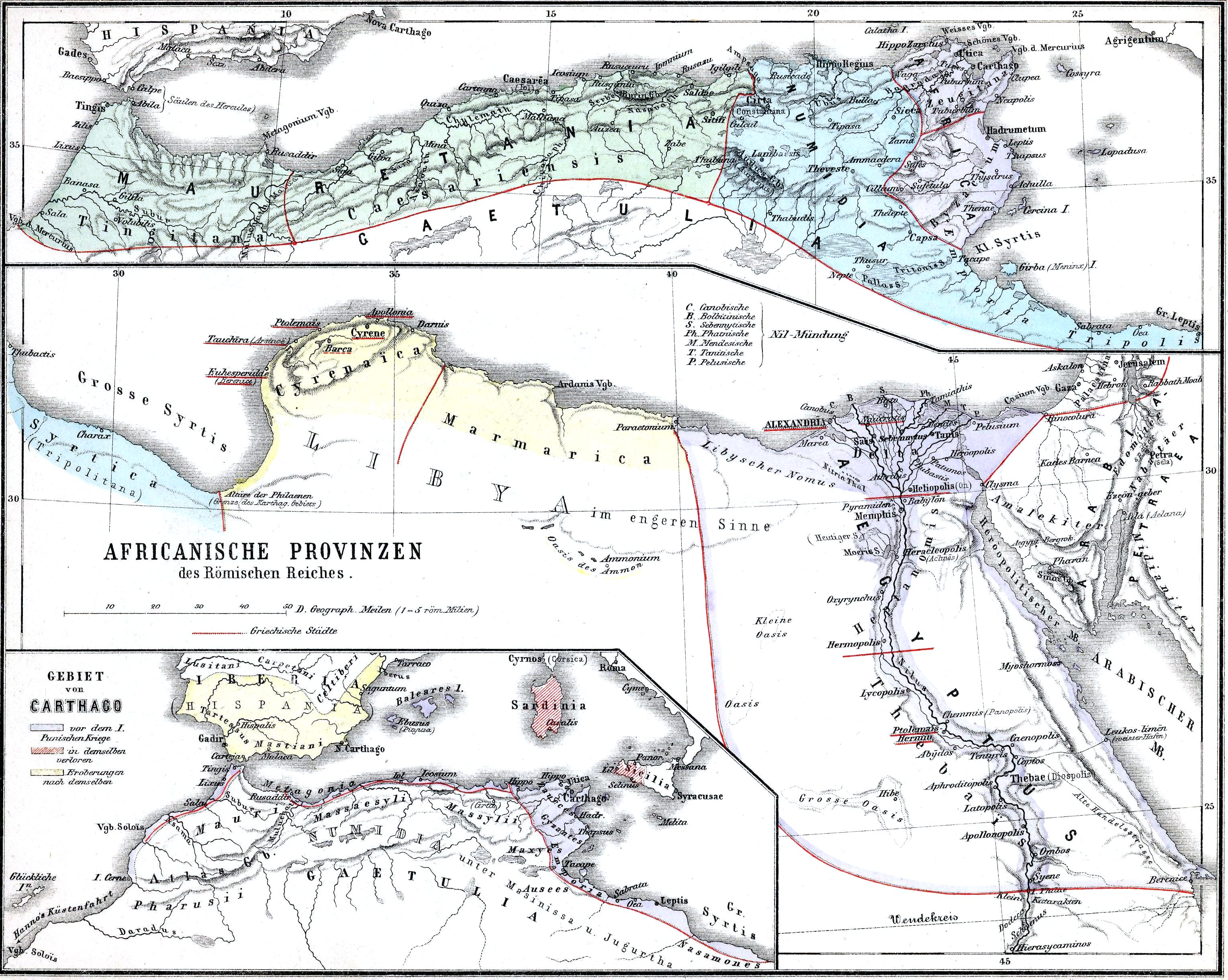
Roman North Africa

Maxita is located in the Al-Asnam region of Algeria. It is an ancient Christian episcopal see in the Roman province of Mauretania Caesariensis, suffragan of the Metropolitan of its capital Caesarea Mauretaniae.

It may have been centered on the unrecorded basilica discovered at Al Asnam, but was to fade.

Only one bishop is known from antiquity: Felix (Italian: Felice), among the Catholic prelates summoned to the Council of Carthage (484) by the Arian Vandal king Huneric.

== Titulars see ==
The diocese of Maxita (the Italian Curiate form being Massita) was nominally restored in 1933 as a titular bishopric, of the lowest (episcopal) rank.

It has had the following, near-consecutive incumbents:

- Romeo Roy Blanchette † (8 Feb 1965 Appointed – 19 July 1966 Appointed, Bishop of Joliet in Illinois, US)
- John Gerard McClean † (10 Dec 1966 Appointed – 12 June 1967 Succeeded, Bishop of Middlesbrough, England, UK)
- Camille-André Le Blanc † (8 Jan 1969 Appointed – 23 Nov 1970 Resigned)
- Joseph Lawson Howze (8 Nov 1972 Appointed – 8 March 1977 Appointed, Bishop of Biloxi, Mississippi, US)
- Jesús María de Jesús Moya (13 April 1977 Appointed – 20 April 1984 Appointed, Bishop of San Francisco de Macorís)
- Michael Patrick Driscoll (19 Dec 1989 Appointed – 18 Jan 1999 Appointed, Bishop of Boise, Idaho, US)
- Marián Chovanec (22 July 1999 Appointed – 20 Nov 2012 Appointed, Bishop of Banská Bystrica)
- Michel Christian Alain Aupetit (2 Feb 2013 Appointed – 4 April 2014 Appointed, Bishop of Nanterre, France)
- Pierantonio Tremolada (24 May 2014 Appointed – 12 July 2017), Auxiliary bishop of Milan, appointed, Bishop of Brescia)
- Andrzej Kaleta (8 Nov 2017 Appointed – present), Auxiliary bishop of Kielce
Coat of arms of Michael Patrick Driscoll.

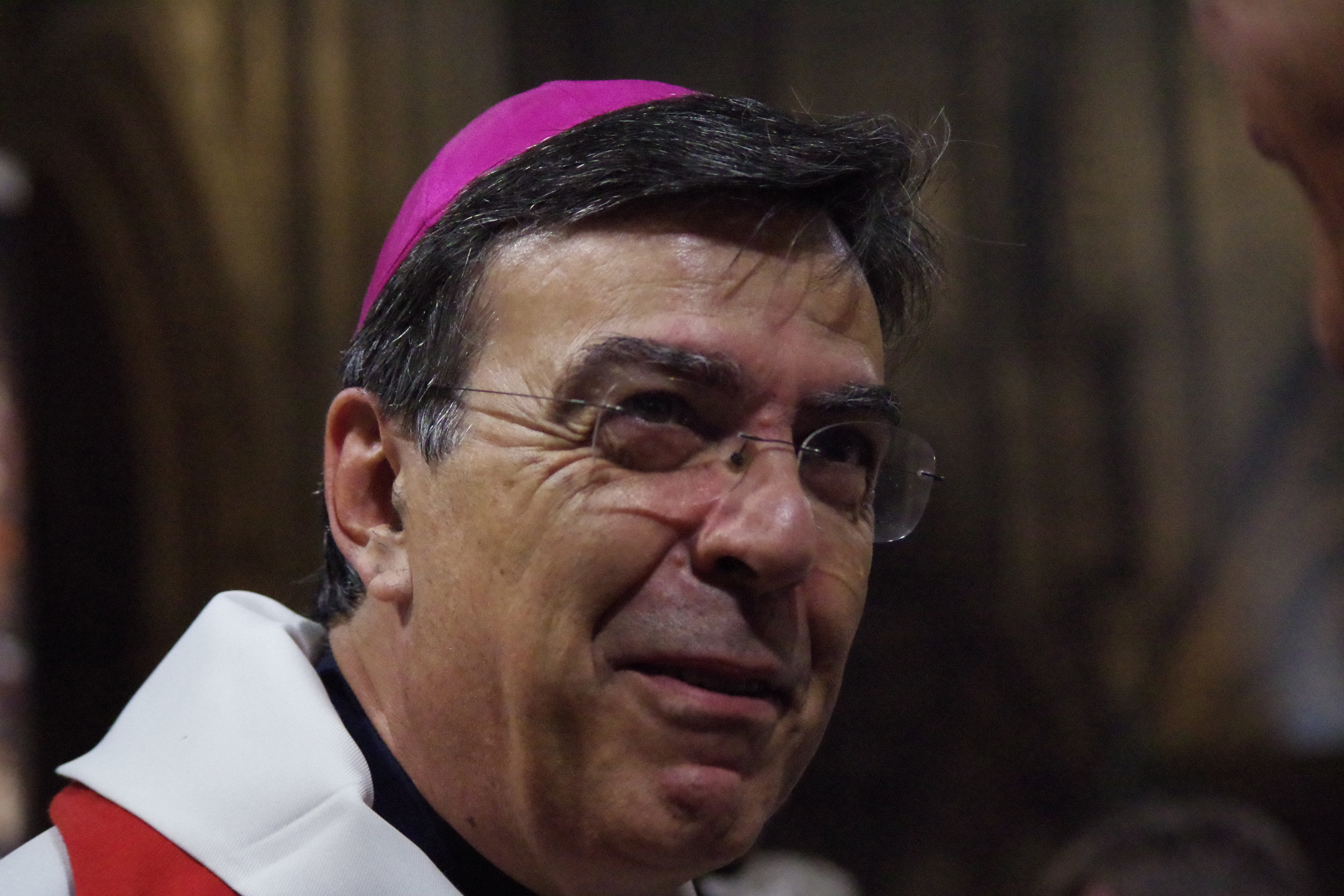
Mgr. Alain Aupetit 2015.

Coat of arms of Pierantonio Tremolada.

== See also ==
- Catholic Church in Africa
