= Episcopal Conference of the Dominican Republic =

Assembly of Catholic bishops in the Dominican Republic

Conference of the Dominican Episcopate
- Conferencia del Episcopado Dominicano
- Abbreviation: CED
- Formation: 1962
- Type: Episcopal conference
- Purpose: To support the ministry of bishops
- Headquarters: Santo Domingo
- Region served: The Dominican Republic
- Members: Active and retired Catholic bishops of the Dominican Republic
- President: Ramón Alfredo de la Cruz Baldera
- Website: ced.org.do (in Spanish)

The Conference of the Dominican Episcopate (Spanish: Conferencia del Episcopado Dominicano, CED) is the body of the Catholic Church in the Dominican Republic. The first Episcopal National Commission of the Dominican Republic was established in 1954. Its name was changed to the Conferencia del Episcopado Dominicano on 22 September 1962, when the Holy See approved its statutes. The first plenary meeting of the CED met in 1963, and the episcopal commissions were created in 1966.

The main bodies which make up the conference are the Plenary Assembly, the Permanent Council, its Secretary General, 16 committee and a national ecclesiastical court.

The CED is a member of the Latin American Episcopal Conference.

== List of presidents of the Bishops' Conference ==
- 1958–1961: Ricardo Pittini, Archbishop of Santo Domingo
- 1961–1979: Octavio Beras Rojas, Archbishop of Santo Domingo
- 1979–1981: Juan Antonio Santana Flores, Archbishop of Santiago de los Caballeros
- 1981–1984: Hugo Eduardo Polanco Brito, Archbishop of Nuestra Señora de la Altagracia en Higüey
- 1984–2002: Nicolás de Jesús López Rodríguez, Archbishop of Santo Domingo
- 2002–2008: Ramón Benito de la Rosa y Carpio, Bishop of Nuestra Señora de la Altagracia en Higüey and Archbishop of Santiago de los Caballeros
- 2008–2017: Nicolás de Jesús López Rodríguez, Archbishop of Santo Domingo
- 2017–2020 Diómedes Espinal de León, Bishop of Mao-Monti Cristi
- 2020–2023: Freddy Antonio de Jesús Bretón Martínez, Archbishop of Santiago de los Caballeros
- 2023–2026: Héctor Rafael Rodríguez Rodríguez, Archbishop of Santiago de los Caballeros
- 2026–present: Ramón Alfredo de la Cruz Baldera, Bishop of San Francisco de Macorís

== Publications ==
The conference issued a pastoral letter on the relationship between humanity and the environment (Sobre la relación del hombre con la naturaleza) on 21 January 1987.

== See also ==
- Catholic Church in the Dominican Republic
