= List of Catholic dioceses in the Dominican Republic =

The Roman Catholic Church in the Dominican Republic comprises two ecclesiastical provinces, each headed by an archbishop. Each province is subdivided into an archdiocese and dioceses (nine in total), each headed by a bishop or an archbishop.

== Structured list of dioceses ==
=== Episcopal Conference of the Dominican Republic ===
==== Ecclesiastical province of Santo Domingo ====
- Archdiocese of Santo Domingo
  - Diocese of Baní
  - Diocese of Barahona
  - Diocese of Nuestra Señora de la Altagracia en Higüey
  - Diocese of San Juan de la Maguana
  - Diocese of San Pedro de Macorís

==== Ecclesiastical province of Santiago de los Caballeros ====
- Archdiocese of Santiago de los Caballeros
  - Diocese of La Vega
  - Diocese of Mao-Monte Cristi
  - Diocese of Puerto Plata
  - Diocese of San Francisco de Macorís

==== Sui iuris jurisdictions ====
- Military Bishopric of Dominican Republic

== List of dioceses ==
Ecclesiastical Jurisdictions	Latin name	Type	Rite	Ecclesiastical Province	Established	Area (km^{2})
Baní	Baniensis	Diocese	Roman	Santo Domingo	8 November 1986	2,892
Barahona	Barahonensis	Diocese	Roman	Santo Domingo	24 April 1976	6,973
Dominican Republic	Reipublicae Dominicanae	Military Ordinariate	Roman	Immediately subject to the Holy See	23 January 1958	—
La Vega	Vegensis	Diocese	Roman	Santiago de los Caballeros	25 September 1953	4,919
Mao-Monte Cristi	Maoënsis–Montis Christi	Diocese	Roman	Santiago de los Caballeros	16 January 1978	4,841
Nuestra Señora de la Altagracia en Higüey	Higueyensis / a Domina Nostra vulgo de la Altagracia in Higüey	Diocese	Roman	Santo Domingo	1 April 1959	5,437
Puerto Plata	Portus Argentarii	Diocese	Roman	Santiago de los Caballeros	16 December 1996	2,700
San Francisco de Macorís	Sancti Francisci de Macoris	Diocese	Roman	Santiago de los Caballeros	16 January 1978	3,682
San Juan de la Maguana	Sancti Ioannis Maguanensis	Diocese	Roman	Santo Domingo	25 September 1953	7,476
San Pedro de Macorís	Sancti Petri de Macoris	Diocese	Roman	Santo Domingo	1 February 1997	2,588
Santiago de los Caballeros	Sancti Iacobi Equitum	Metropolitan Archdiocese	Roman	Santiago de los Caballeros	25 September 1953	6,391
Santo Domingo	Sancti Dominici	Metropolitan Archdiocese	Roman	Santo Domingo	8 August 1511	4,033
