= Fausto Ramón Mejía Vallejo =

Dominican Roman Catholic bishop (born 1941)

The Most Reverend Fausto Ramón Mejía Vallejo
- Bishop Emeritus of San Francisco de Macorís
- Church: Roman Catholic Church
- Diocese: San Francisco de Macorís
- Appointed: 31 May 2012
- Installed: 28 July 2012
- Term ended: 15 May 2021
- Predecessor: Jesús María de Jesús Moya
- Successor: Ramón Alfredo de la Cruz Baldera

Orders
- Ordination: 26 November 1972 by Juan Antonio Flores Santana
- Consecration: 28 July 2012 by Nicolás de Jesús López Rodríguez

Personal details
- Born: Fausto Ramón Mejía Vallejo; 15 December 1941 (age 84) Bejucal, Bonao, Dominican Republic
- Education: Autonomous University of Santo Domingo, Pontifical Gregorian University, Pontifical Lateran University
- Motto: Fiat mihi voluntas tua
- Coat of arms: Fausto Ramón Mejía Vallejo's coat of arms

Fausto Ramón Mejía Vallejo (born 15 December 1941) is a Dominican Roman Catholic prelate who served as the bishop of the Diocese of San Francisco de Macorís from 2012 until his resignation was accepted in 2021. He was appointed to the diocese by Pope Benedict XVI on 31 May 2012, succeeding Jesús María de Jesús Moya. His resignation was accepted by Pope Francis on 15 May 2021, and he was succeeded by Ramón Alfredo de la Cruz Baldera.

== Early life and education ==
Mejía Vallejo was born on 15 December 1941 in Bejucal, a community in the municipality of Bonao, in the Dominican Republic. He was one of ten children of Hirán Mejía and María Eusebia Vallejo. He attended the Manuel Aybar schools and the Elías Rodríguez secondary school. After completing his secondary education, he worked as a teacher at the Manuel Aybar school between January 1960 and September 1963.

On 3 October 1963, he entered the San Pío X Minor Seminary in Santiago de los Caballeros, where he studied Latin. In 1965, he continued his studies at the Santo Tomás de Aquino Major Seminary, studying philosophy and theology. He subsequently completed studies in pedagogy and philosophy at the Autonomous University of Santo Domingo.

In 1979, he was sent to Rome for further studies. He obtained a licentiate in spiritual theology from the Pontifical Gregorian University and a doctorate in theology from the Pontifical Lateran University.

== Priesthood ==
Mejía Vallejo was ordained a priest on 26 November 1972 in Bonao by Bishop Juan Antonio Flores Santana for the Diocese of La Vega.

Following his ordination, he served in several pastoral and educational positions in the Diocese of La Vega. He was rector of the Santo Cura de Ars Minor Seminary and director of the diocesan vocation ministry. He also served as a parish priest in Sabaneta, Bonao and Jarabacoa.

Between 1981 and 1988, he worked as a formator and professor of theology at the Santo Tomás de Aquino Major Seminary. He subsequently served as rector of the institution from 1995 to 2002. During this period, he also contributed reflections and articles to the magazine Amigo del Hogar and founded and directed the theological-pastoral journal Perspectivas.

In 2002, he was appointed rector of the Universidad Católica Tecnológica del Cibao (UCATECI), a Catholic university in the Diocese of La Vega. During his tenure, he oversaw institutional and infrastructure development, curricular reforms and academic programmes. He held the position until his episcopal appointment in 2012.

== Episcopal ministry ==
=== Appointment and consecration ===
On 31 May 2012, Pope Benedict XVI accepted the resignation of Bishop Jesús María de Jesús Moya and appointed Mejía Vallejo as his successor as bishop of San Francisco de Macorís. At the time of his appointment, Mejía Vallejo was serving as rector of UCATECI and was a priest of the Diocese of La Vega.

His appointment was also reported by Schoenstatt.org, which noted his membership in the Institute of Diocesan Priests of Schoenstatt.

He received episcopal consecration on 28 July 2012 at the Estadio Julian Javier in San Francisco de Macorís. The principal consecrator was Cardinal Nicolás de Jesús López Rodríguez, Archbishop of Santo Domingo, assisted by Archbishop Ramón Benito de la Rosa y Carpio and Bishop Jesús María de Jesús Moya.

He became the third bishop of the Diocese of San Francisco de Macorís and also served as grand chancellor of the Universidad Católica Nordestana (UCNE).

=== Resignation ===
On 15 May 2021, Pope Francis accepted Mejía Vallejo's resignation from the pastoral government of the Diocese of San Francisco de Macorís. The same announcement named Ramón Alfredo de la Cruz Baldera as his successor.

Following his retirement, Mejía Vallejo held the title of bishop emeritus of San Francisco de Macorís.

== Publications ==
Mejía Vallejo has written books on Christian spirituality, theology and catechetical formation. His published works include:

- Jesucristo Evangelio viviente del Padre (1997)
- El Espíritu Santo y nosotros (1998)
- Vamos hacia el Padre (1999)
- Vida Nueva para un siglo nuevo (2000)
- Hacia un nuevo paradigma (2002)
- El vivir que nos hace felices (2005)
- La formación en valores (2009)
- Los valores están ahí y te llaman (2010)
- El cambio que nos libera (2012)

== Recognition ==
In 2012, the municipal council of La Vega declared Mejía Vallejo an Hijo Meritísimo (Most Meritorious Son) through Resolution 14-2012, recognising his contributions to education, religion and society.
