= André Vingt-Trois =

French Catholic cardinal (1942–2025)

His Eminence André Vingt-Trois
- Cardinal; Archbishop of Paris
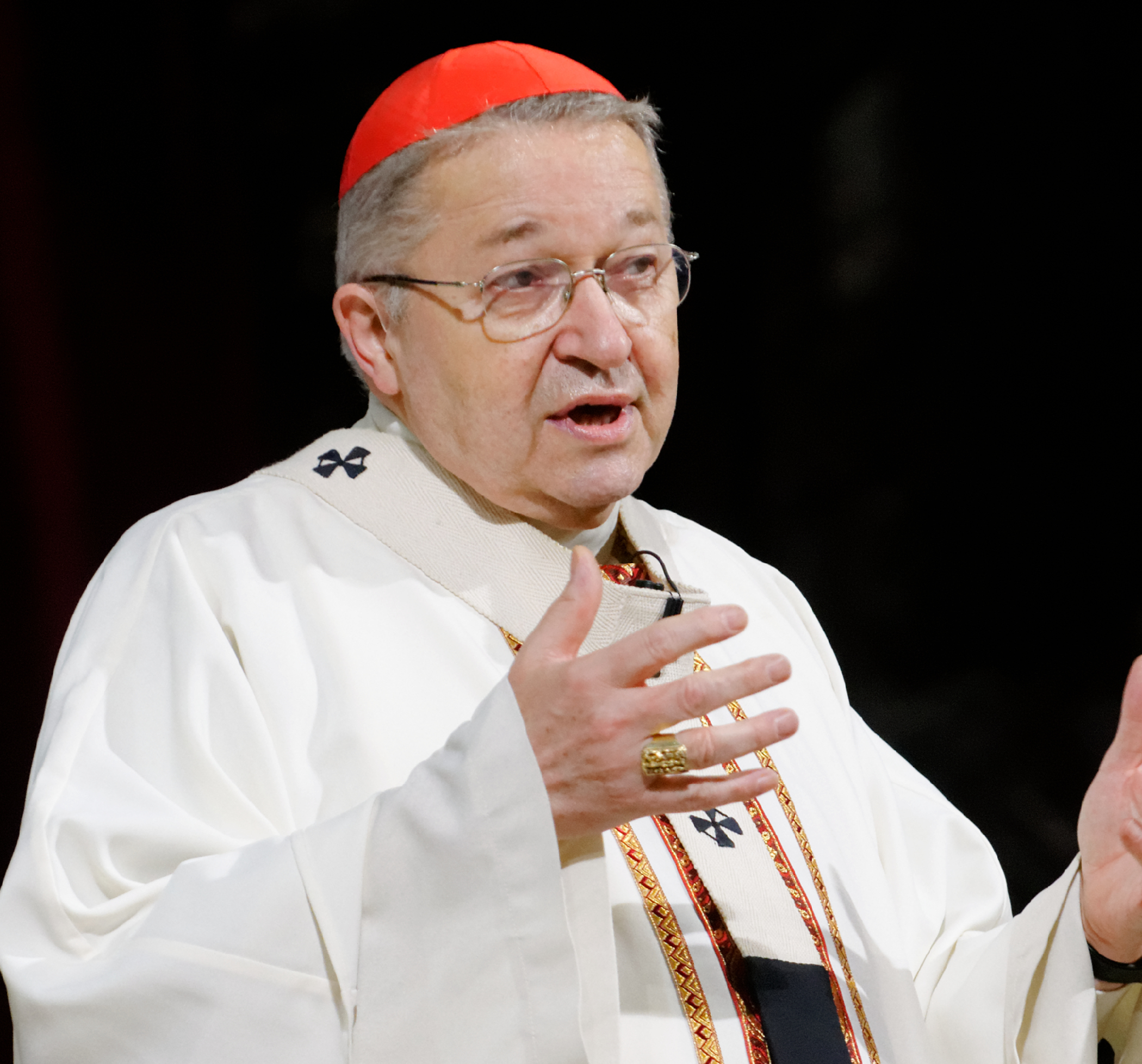
- Vingt-Trois in 2012
- Church: Cathédrale Notre-Dame de Paris
- Archdiocese: Paris
- Appointed: 11 February 2005
- Installed: 5 March 2005
- Term ended: 7 December 2017
- Predecessor: Jean-Marie Lustiger
- Successor: Michel Aupetit
- Other posts: Cardinal-Priest of San Luigi dei Francesi; Ordinary of French Faithful of Eastern Rites
- Previous posts: Archbishop of Tours (1999–2005); Auxiliary Bishop of Paris (1988–1999); Titular Bishop of Thibilis (1988–1999)

Orders
- Ordination: 28 June 1969 by François Marty
- Consecration: 14 October 1988 by Jean-Marie Lustiger
- Created cardinal: 24 November 2007 by Benedict XVI
- Rank: Cardinal-Priest

Personal details
- Born: André Armand Vingt-Trois; 7 November 1942 Paris, France
- Died: 18 July 2025 (aged 82) Paris, France
- Buried: Archbishop's Vault, Notre-Dame Cathedral
- Denomination: Roman Catholic
- Motto: Sic enim Deus Dilexit Mundum (For God so Loved the World)

- Coat of arms

Styles of André Vingt-Trois
- Reference style: His Eminence
- Spoken style: Your Eminence
- Informal style: Cardinal
- See: Paris

André Armand Vingt-Trois (French: [ɑ̃dʁe aʁmɑ̃ vɛ̃ttʁwɑ]; 7 November 1942 – 18 July 2025) was a French cardinal of the Catholic Church. He served as Archbishop of Paris from 2005 to 2017, having previously served as Archbishop of Tours from 1999 to 2005. He was made a cardinal in 2007.

== Early life and ordination ==
Vingt-Trois was born in Paris, France, to Armand Vingt-Trois and Paulette (née Vuillamy). His surname, which is French for "twenty-three", is probably from an ancestor who, as a child or baby, was abandoned and found on the 23rd day of the month. Vingt-Trois completed his secondary studies at the Lycée Henri IV and entered the Seminary of Saint-Sulpice at Issy-les-Moulineaux in 1962. He then attended the Institut Catholique de Paris, from where he obtained his licentiate in moral theology. From 1964 to 1965, Vingt-Trois performed his military service in Germany. He was ordained to the diaconate by Bishop Daniel Pézeril in October 1968 and to the priesthood by Cardinal François Marty on 28 June 1969.

=== Pastoral work ===
During his priestly ministry, he worked especially in parochial catechetics and the formation of the laity. From 1974 to 1981, Vingt-Trois was vicar at the Parisian parish of Sainte-Jeanne de Chantal. He then served as director of his alma mater of the Seminary of Saint-Sulpice until 1988, also teaching moral and sacramental theology there. Vingt-Trois participated in different pastoral movements, including the Centre de préparation au mariage and the sessions of permanent formation of the clergy. He was later named vicar general of Paris, and was charged with the diocesan formation (the cathedral school and diocesan seminary), of the means of communications (Radio Notre-Dame, Paris Notre-Dame, Centre d'Information), of the familial pastoral, of the chaplains of public education, and of catechetics.

== Episcopate ==
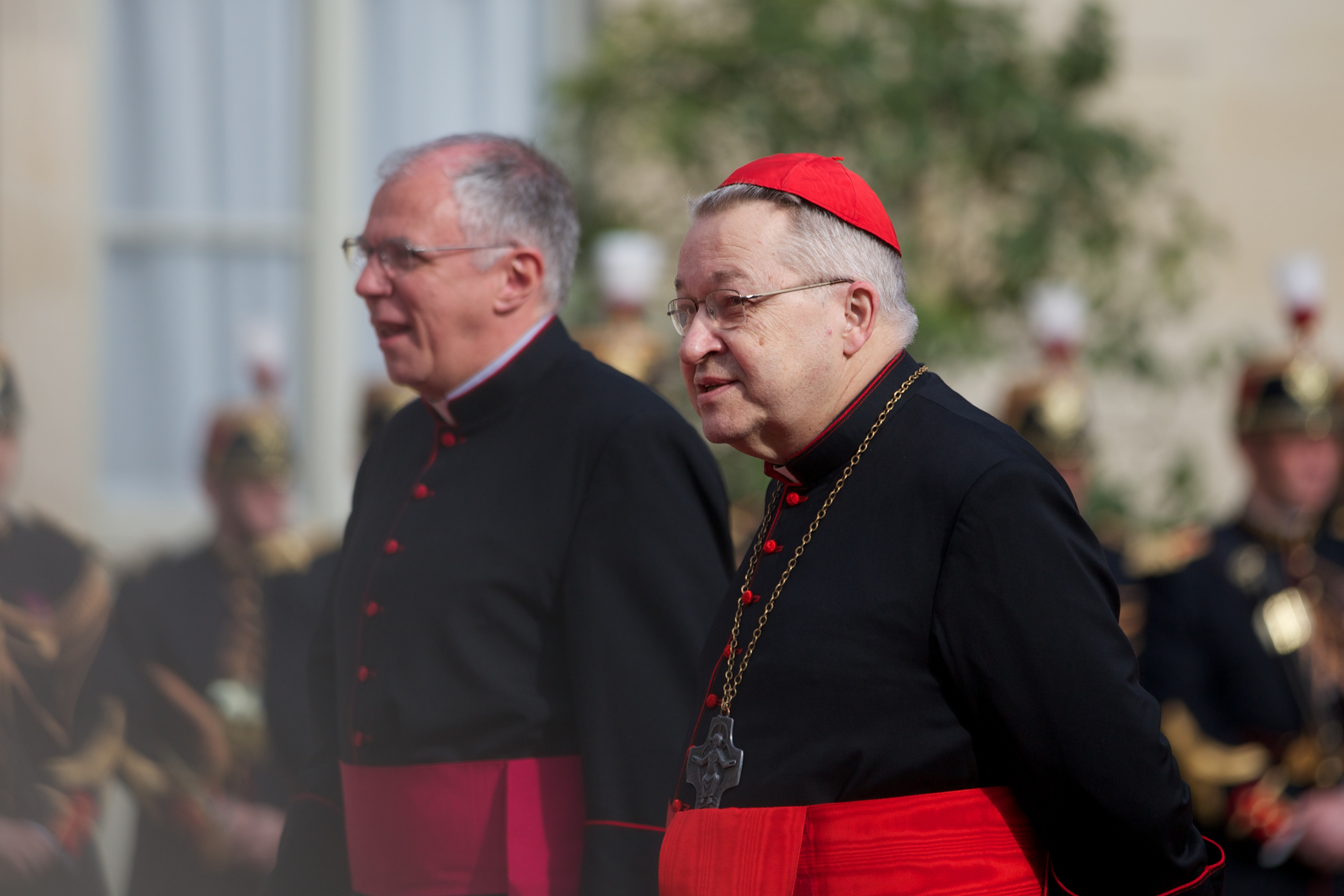
André Vingt-Trois at the May 2012 inauguration ceremony of Francois Hollande as President of France, at the Élysée Palace in Paris

On 25 June 1988, Vingt-Trois was appointed Auxiliary Bishop of Paris and Titular Bishop of Thibilis by Pope John Paul II. He received his episcopal consecration on the following 14 October in Notre-Dame Cathedral from Cardinal Jean-Marie Lustiger, with Bishops Pézeril and Gabriel Vanel serving as co-consecrators. Vingt-Trois was appointed Archbishop of Tours on 21 April 1999, and Archbishop of Paris on 11 February 2005. He was installed in Paris on the following 5 March and additionally appointed Ordinary of French Catholics of the Eastern Rites on 14 March. On 5 November 2007, he was elected President of the French Episcopal Conference for a term of three years.

== Cardinalate ==
Pope Benedict XVI created him Cardinal-Priest of S. Luigi dei Francesi in the consistory of 23 November 2007.

Vingt-Trois was a member of the Congregation for Bishops and the Pontifical Council for the Family from 12 June 2008 and of the Congregation for the Clergy since 2 February 2010. On 7 March 2012 he was appointed a member of the Congregation for the Oriental Churches. In October 2012, after being appointed a synod father by Pope Benedict, he took part in the 13th Ordinary General Assembly of the Synod of Bishops, which concerned itself with the new evangelization for the transmission of the Christian faith.

He was one of the cardinal electors who participated in the 2013 papal conclave that selected Pope Francis. Vingt-Trois opposed efforts to introduce same-sex marriage in France, warning in 2013 that it could incite violence and split society, and that as long as the government is not listening to French citizens, this could lead to more violence. Francis accepted his resignation as Archbishop of Paris on 7 December 2017.

Vingt-Trois was no longer eligible to participate in papal conclaves, having reached the age of 80 on 7 November 2022, so he was not part of the 2025 conclave.

== Death ==
Vingt-Trois died on 18 July 2025, at the age of 82. His funeral took place on 23 July 2025, at Notre-Dame Cathedral. His remains was buried in the Archbishop's Vault in the Crypt of at Notre-Dame Cathedral in Paris.

== Honours and awards ==
- Officier of the Order of Legion of Honour
- Officier of the Ordre National du Mérite
- Grand-Officier of the National Order of Benin

== See also ==
- Catholic Church in France
- List of the Roman Catholic dioceses of France

Catholic Church titles
Preceded by Jorge Arturo Medina Estévez	— TITULAR — Titular Bishop of Thibilis; 25 June 1988 – 21 April 1999	Succeeded by Johannes Gerardus Maria van Burgsteden
Preceded by Michel Moutel	Archbishop of Tours; 21 April 1999 – 11 February 2005	Succeeded by Bernard-Nicolas Aubertin
Preceded by Jean-Marie Lustiger	Archbishop of Paris; 11 February 2005 – 7 December 2017	Succeeded by Michel Aupetit
Preceded by Jean-Marie Lustiger	Ordinary of France of the Eastern Rite; 14 March 2005 – 7 December 2017	Succeeded by Michel Aupetit
Preceded by Jean-Pierre Bernard Ricard	President of the French Episcopal Conference; 5 November 2007 – 30 June 2013	Succeeded by Georges Paul Pontier
Preceded by Jean-Marie Lustiger	Cardinal-Priest of San Luigi dei Francesi; 24 November 2007 – 18 July 2025	Vacant
