= Archbishop of Santiago =

Archbishop of Santiago may refer to:

- Archbishop of Santiago (Chile)
- Archbishop of Santiago de Cuba
- Archbishop of Santiago de los Caballeros, Dominican Republic
- Archbishop of the Roman Catholic Archdiocese of Santiago de Guatemala
- Archbishop of Santiago de Compostela, in Galicia, Spain
