= Michel Aupetit =

French prelate of the Catholic Church (born 1951)

The Most Reverend Michel Aupetit
- Archbishop Emeritus of Paris
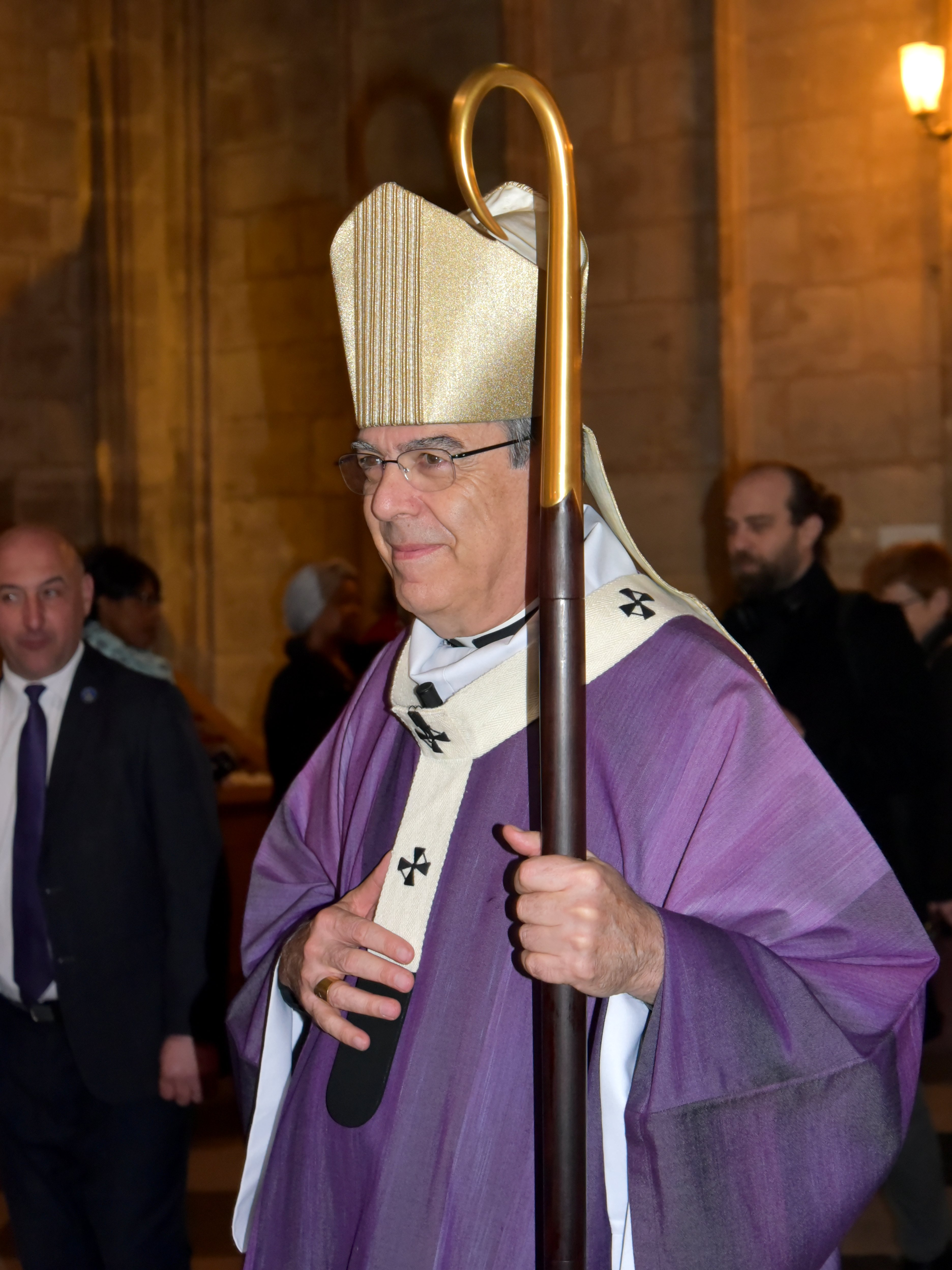
- Michel Aupetit in 2019
- Archdiocese: Paris (emeritus)
- Province: Paris (emeritus)
- See: Paris (emeritus)
- Appointed: 7 December 2017
- Installed: 6 January 2018
- Term ended: 2 December 2021
- Predecessor: André Vingt-Trois
- Successor: Laurent Ulrich
- Other post: Ordinary of French Faithful of Eastern Rites (2018–)
- Previous posts: Auxiliary Bishop of Paris (2013–14); Titular Bishop of Maxita (2013–14); Bishop of Nanterre (2014–17)

Orders
- Ordination: 24 June 1995 by Jean-Marie Lustiger
- Consecration: 19 April 2013 by André Vingt-Trois

Personal details
- Born: Michel Christian Alain Aupetit; 23 March 1951 (age 75) Versailles, France
- Motto: Je suis venu pour que les hommes aient la vie pour qu'ils l'aient en abondance ("I am come that they might have life, and have it in abundance")
- Signature: Michel Aupetit's signature

Michel Christian Alain Aupetit (French: [miʃɛl op(ə)ti]; born 23 March 1951) is a French prelate of the Catholic Church who was Archbishop of Paris from 2018 to 2021, when he resigned following reports of a relationship with a woman in 2012.

He was previously the Bishop of Nanterre beginning in April 2014 and before that an Auxiliary Bishop of Paris. Before becoming a priest, he was a physician and practiced medicine for more than twenty years.

== Early years ==
Born in Versailles (Yvelines) on 23 March 1951, Michel Aupetit grew up in Chaville et Viroflay in the western part of the Île-de-France.

After attending his secondary school at the Lycée Hoche (Versailles), Aupetit studied at the Bichat Medical School of the University of Paris VII where he received an MD degree in 1978. He further specialized in medical ethics with obtaining a DU degree in this field from the Faculty of Medicine of Créteil in 1994. His studies included time at Hôpital Bichat and Hôpital Necker. After that, he practiced general medicine in Colombes from 1979 to 1990. He taught medical ethics from 1997 to 2006 at the Centre hospitalier universitaire Henri-Mondor in Créteil.

Aupetit then studied for the priesthood at the seminary of Paris where he earned a Canonical Baccalaureate in Theology. He was ordained a priest for the Archdiocese of Paris on 24 June 1995 at the age of 44. He served initially as a vicar of the Church of Saint-Louis-en-l'Île from 1995 to 1998, and then of Saint-Paul-Saint-Louis from 1998 to 2001. He was also chaplain of high and middle schools of the Marais from 1995 to 2001. From 2001 to 2006, he was assigned to the parish of Église Notre-Dame-de-l'Arche-d'Alliance, and dean in the Pasteur-Vaugirard deanery from 2004 to 2006.

From 2006 to 2013 he was vicar general of the Archdiocese of Paris.

== Bishop ==
On 2 February 2013 Pope Benedict XVI named him auxiliary bishop of Paris and titular bishop of Massita. He received his episcopal consecration from Cardinal André Vingt-Trois.

Pope Francis appointed him Bishop of Nanterre on 4 April 2014 and he was installed there on 4 May.

On 7 December 2017, Pope Francis appointed him Archbishop of Paris, and he was installed there on 6 January 2018. Pope Francis named him a member of the Congregation for the Oriental Churches on 6 August 2019.

On 5 September 2019, Aupetit and Rémy Heitz, the lead prosecutor in Paris, signed an accord agreeing to better cooperation in order to speed up sex abuse investigations.

In late November 2021, Aupetit offered to resign after admitting to having had a relationship with a woman in 2012, before becoming a bishop, though he disputed press reports that described that relationship as a "double life" and called it an "ambiguous" relationship that did not include sexual relations. Pope Francis accepted his resignation on 2 December 2021. He was replaced by Laurent Ulrich.

== Sexual assault probe ==
In November 2022, French police began an investigation with allegations that several years before, Aupetit had sexually assaulted a woman who was under legal protection as a vulnerable individual. Aupetit stated that he had never had a romantic or sexual relationship with the woman in question, while the woman stated that the situation did not constitute a criminal offense, resulting in the case being closed in September 2023.

== Selected works ==
- Construisons-nous une societe humaine ou inhumaine?, Dumoulin, 2016
- La mort, et après?: Un prêtre médecin témoigne et répond aux interrogations, Salvator, 2009
- L'homme, le sexe et Dieu: Pour une sexualité plus humaine, Salvator, 2011
- Qu'est ce que l'homme?, Francois-Xavier de Guibert, 2010
- L'embryon, quels enjeux?, Salvator, 2008
- Contraception: la réponse de l'Eglise, Pierre Téqui, 2000

Catholic Church titles
Preceded by Marián Chovanec	— TITULAR — Titular Bishop of Maxita; 2013 – 2014	Succeeded by Pierantonio Tremolada
Preceded by Gérard Daucourt	Bishop of Nanterre; 2014 – 2017	Succeeded by Matthieu Rougé
Preceded by André Vingt-Trois	Archbishop of Paris; 2017 – 2021	Succeeded by Laurent Ulrich
Preceded by André Vingt-Trois	Ordinary of France of the Eastern Rite; 2017 – 2021	Succeeded by Laurent Ulrich
