= Nanterre Cathedral =

Cathedral in Nanterre, France

Coordinates: 48°53′27″N 2°11′46″E

Nanterre Cathedral Cathédrale Sainte-Geneviève-et-Saint-Maurice de Nanterre
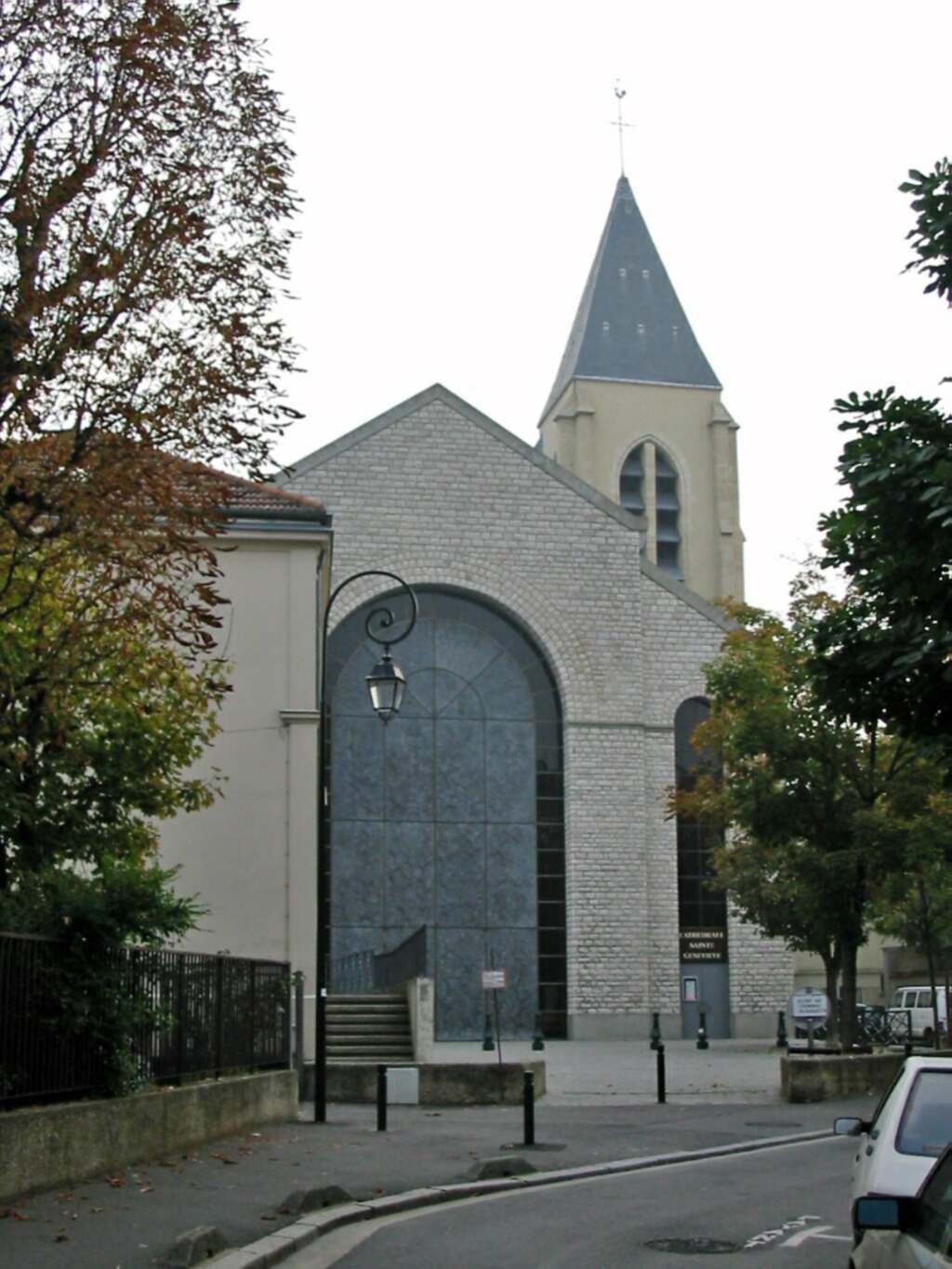
- Nanterre Cathedral

Religion
- Affiliation: Roman Catholic Church
- Province: Bishop of Nanterre
- Region: Hauts-de-Seine
- Rite: Roman
- Ecclesiastical or organisational status: Cathedral
- Status: Active

Location
- Location: Nanterre, France
- Interactive map of Nanterre Cathedral; Cathédrale Sainte-Geneviève-et-Saint-Maurice de Nanterre

Architecture
- Type: church
- Style: Art Deco

Nanterre Cathedral (French: Cathédrale Sainte-Geneviève-et-Saint-Maurice de Nanterre) is a Roman Catholic church located in the town of Nanterre, France.

The cathedral is the seat of the Bishop of Nanterre. Formerly Nanterre Parish Church, it became the Nanterre Cathedral after the establishment of the diocese in 1966.
