= Pierantonio Tremolada =

Italian Roman Catholic prelate (born 1956)

The Most Reverend Bishop Pierantonio Tremolada
- Bishop of Brescia
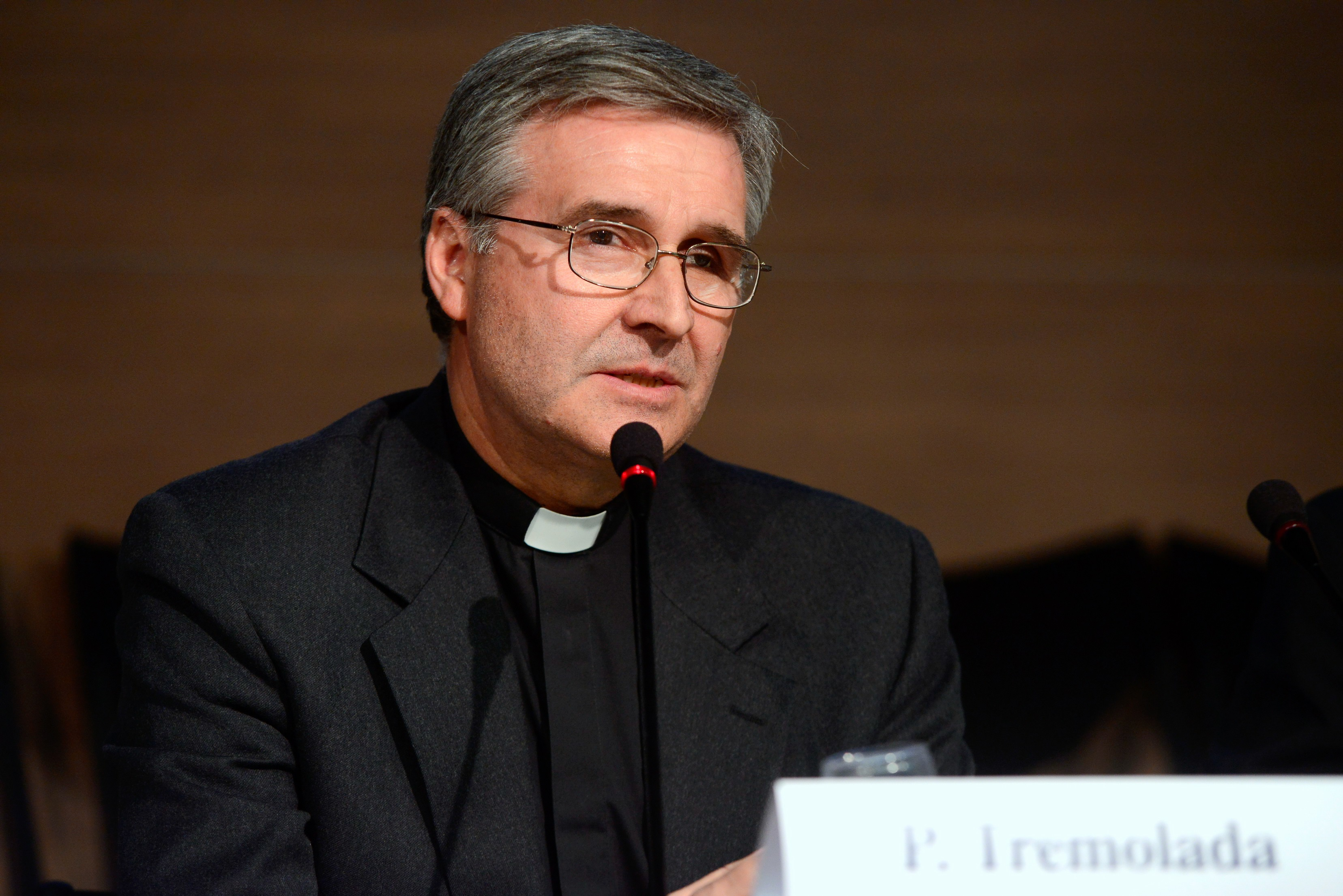
- Church: Catholic Church
- Diocese: Brescia
- See: Brescia
- Appointed: 12 July 2017
- Installed: 8 October 2017
- Predecessor: Luciano Monari
- Previous posts: Titular Bishop of Maxita (2014-17); Auxiliary Bishop of Milan (2014-17)

Orders
- Ordination: 13 June 1981 by Carlo Maria Martini
- Consecration: 28 June 2014 by Angelo Scola
- Rank: Bishop

Personal details
- Born: Pierantonio Tremolada; 4 October 1956 (age 70) Lissone, Italy
- Education: Pontifical Biblical Institute
- Motto: Haurietis de fontibus salutis ("You will draw water joyfully from the springs of salvation")
- Coat of arms: Pierantonio Tremolada's coat of arms

Styles of Pierantonio Tremolada
- Reference style: The Most Reverend
- Spoken style: Your Excellency
- Religious style: Monsignor

Pierantonio Tremolada (born 4 October 1956 in Lissone) is an Italian Roman Catholic prelate who serves as the current Bishop of Brescia since his appointment on 12 July 2017. Prior to this he had served as a bishop in Milan.

== Life ==
Pierantonio Tremolada was born in Lissone on 4 October 1956.

Tremolada received his ordination to the priesthood from the then-Archbishop Carlo Maria Martini on 13 June 1981 and was sent afterwards to the Collegio Lombardo and to the Pontifical Biblical Institute where he received a bachelor's degree in Sacred Scripture. Beginning in 1985 he served as a professor of religious texts at the Theological College in Venegono until 2012. From 1997 until 2012 he served as the rector for the formation of permanent deacons. He was appointed a Monsignor on 10 August 2012.

On 24 May 2014 Pope Francis appointed Tremolada Titular Bishop of Maxita and an Auxiliary Bishop of Milan. Tremolada received his episcopal consecration on 28 June 2014 from Cardinal Angelo Scola; the co-consecrators were Cardinal Dionigi Tettamanzi and Bishop Mario Enrico Delpini. He was appointed the Bishop of Brescia on 12 July 2017 and he was enthroned in his new episcopal see on 8 October as the successor of Luciano Monari.

Catholic Church titles
Preceded by Michel Christian Alain Aupetit	Titular Bishop of Maxita; 24 May 2014 - 12 July 2017	Succeeded by Vacant
Preceded by Luciano Monari	Roman Catholic Diocese of Brescia; 12 July 2017 – present	Succeeded by Incumbent
