= Gérard Daucourt =

- Bishop Emeritus of Nanterre
- Church: Catholic Church
- Diocese: Diocese of Nanterre
- In office: 18 June 2002 – 14 November 2013
- Predecessor: François Favreau
- Successor: Michel Aupetit
- Previous posts: Bishop of Orléans (1998-2002); Bishop of Troyes (1992-1998); Coadjutor Bishop of Troyes (1991-1992)

Orders
- Ordination: 26 June 1966 by Marcel-Marie Dubois
- Consecration: 14 April 1991 by Lucien Daloz

Personal details
- Born: Gérard Antoine Léopold Daucourt; 29 April 1941 (age 84) Delémont, Canton of Bern, Switzerland

Gérard Daucourt (born 29 April 1941 in Delémont, Switzerland) was the Catholic Bishop of Nanterre 2002–2013 in the Hauts-de-Seine Département in the Paris region, France. Daucourt was ordained as a priest in 1966 when he served in Besançon, France, before subsequently serving as diocesan of Troyes (1992) and then of Orléans (1998).

== Positions ==
Daucourt has made several strong statements (e.g. on the need to vote even if the most suitable available candidate's programme is not close to Christian principles, and criticising the bishop of Recife following excommunications pronounced after a child-mother underwent an abortion). He is close to the Greek orthodox hierarchy at the Phanar in Turkey and together with Cardinal Barbarin of Lyons spent the day of 13 April 2004 (the seventh centenary of the Fourth Crusade taking of Constantinople) in the company of Patriarch Bartholomew there.
