= Ramón Alfredo de la Cruz Baldera =

Dominican Roman Catholic bishop (born 1961)

The Most Reverend Ramón Alfredo de la Cruz Baldera
- Bishop of San Francisco de Macorís
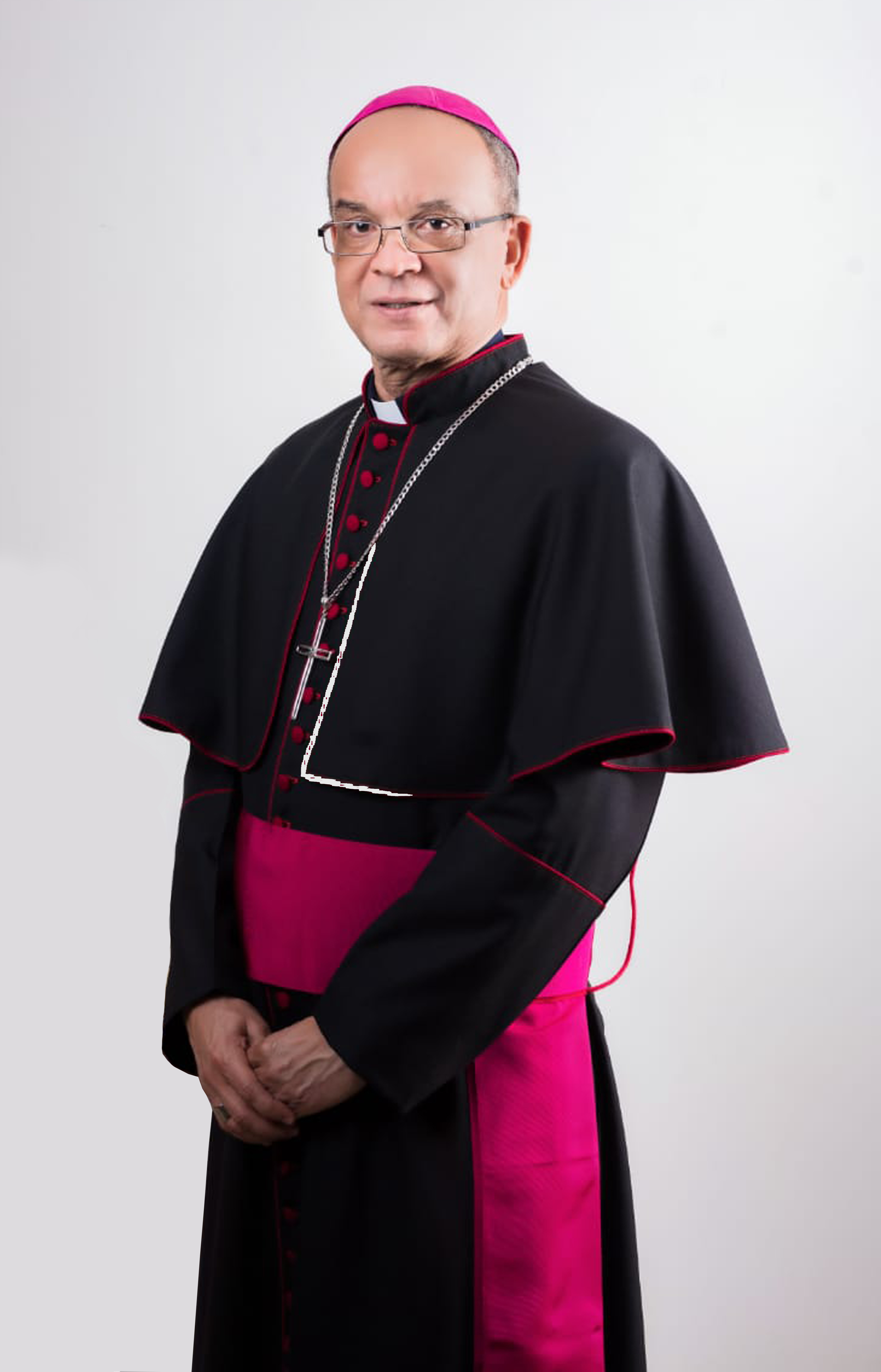
- Church: Catholic Church
- Diocese: San Francisco de Macorís
- Appointed: 15 May 2021
- Installed: 24 July 2021
- Predecessor: Fausto Ramón Mejía Vallejo
- Previous post: Rector of Pontificia Universidad Católica Madre y Maestra

Orders
- Ordination: 12 January 1991
- Consecration: 24 July 2021 by Fausto Ramón Mejía Vallejo

Personal details
- Born: Ramón Alfredo de la Cruz Baldera; 5 July 1961 (age 65) San Francisco de Macorís, Dominican Republic
- Education: Pontificia Universidad Católica Madre y Maestra, University of Bonn, University of Alcalá
- Motto: Dar razón de la esperanza
- Coat of arms: Ramón Alfredo de la Cruz Baldera's coat of arms

Ramón Alfredo de la Cruz Baldera (born 5 July 1961) is a Dominican Roman Catholic prelate who serves as the bishop of San Francisco de Macorís. In July 2026, he was elected president of the Episcopal Conference of the Dominican Republic.

Before his episcopal appointment, he held several academic and ecclesiastical positions, including rector of the Pontificia Universidad Católica Madre y Maestra and the Universidad Católica Nordestana. He also held leadership responsibilities within the Institute of Diocesan Priests of Schoenstatt.

== Early life and education ==
Ramón Alfredo de la Cruz Baldera was born on 5 July 1961 in San Francisco de Macorís, Dominican Republic. He began his ecclesiastical formation in 1977 at the Santo Cura de Ars Minor Seminary in the Diocese of La Vega. In 1981, he continued his studies at the Santo Tomás de Aquino Major Seminary in Santo Domingo.

In 1985, he moved to Germany to study at the Friedrich Wilhelm University of Bonn, where he obtained a licentiate and a doctorate in theology. He also studied philosophy at the Pontificia Universidad Católica Madre y Maestra and subsequently pursued postgraduate studies in university management at the University of Alcalá.

== Priesthood ==
De la Cruz Baldera was ordained a priest on 12 January 1991 and incardinated into the Diocese of San Francisco de Macorís.

Between 1991 and 1995, he served as a parochial vicar at the parish of San Bartolomé in Gurabo, in the Archdiocese of Santiago de los Caballeros, and assisted the rector of the Universidad Católica Nordestana. From 1992 to 1995, he also served at the parish of Santa Cruz in Nagua. Between 1995 and 1996, he was parish priest of San Pablo Apóstol in Los Rieles.

Alongside his pastoral responsibilities, he pursued an academic career. From 1995 to 1996, he taught eschatology at the Universidad Católica de Santo Domingo. Between 1996 and 2000, he worked as a formator at the Santo Tomás de Aquino Pontifical Seminary. From 2000 to 2001, he served as dean of philosophy and professor of Christian anthropology at the same institution.

He subsequently held administrative positions at the Universidad Católica Nordestana, serving as academic vice-rector from 2001 to 2004 and executive vice-rector from 2004 to 2006. From 2006 to 2008, he directed the Department of Education at the Pontificia Universidad Católica Madre y Maestra. He later served as rector of the Universidad Católica Nordestana from 2008 to 2014.

From 2013 to 2015, he was rector of the Institute of Diocesan Priests of Schoenstatt for Mexico, Central America and the Caribbean. He also served as president of the Dominican Association of University Rectors (ADRU).

== Episcopal ministry ==
=== Bishop of San Francisco de Macorís ===
On 15 May 2021, Pope Francis appointed de la Cruz Baldera bishop of San Francisco de Macorís, succeeding Fausto Ramón Mejía Vallejo, whose resignation was accepted by the pope.

He received episcopal consecration on 24 July 2021, with Fausto Ramón Mejía Vallejo serving as principal consecrator.

=== President of the Dominican Episcopal Conference ===
On 2 July 2026, the Episcopal Conference of the Dominican Republic elected de la Cruz Baldera as its president for a new leadership period. The newly elected governing board also included Carlos Tomás Morel Diplán as vice-president, José Amable Durán as secretary-general, and bishops Santiago Rodríguez and Andrés Napoleón Romero as members.

== Academic career ==
De la Cruz Baldera has held numerous positions in Catholic higher education in the Dominican Republic. In addition to his leadership roles at the Universidad Católica Nordestana, he served as rector of the Pontificia Universidad Católica Madre y Maestra in Santiago de los Caballeros.

According to Acento, he was the first graduate of the Pontificia Universidad Católica Madre y Maestra to become rector of the institution. His academic work has included teaching, university administration, priestly formation and participation in Dominican higher-education organizations.

He has published books and academic articles and speaks Spanish, German and English.

== Schoenstatt affiliation ==
De la Cruz Baldera has been associated with the Schoenstatt Movement through the Institute of Diocesan Priests of Schoenstatt. Between 2013 and 2015, he served as rector of its regional institute for Mexico, Central America and the Caribbean.
