= Diocese of La Vega =

Roman Catholic diocese in the Dominican Republic

Coordinates: 19.2240°N 70.5327°W

Diocese of La Vega Dioecesis Vegensis
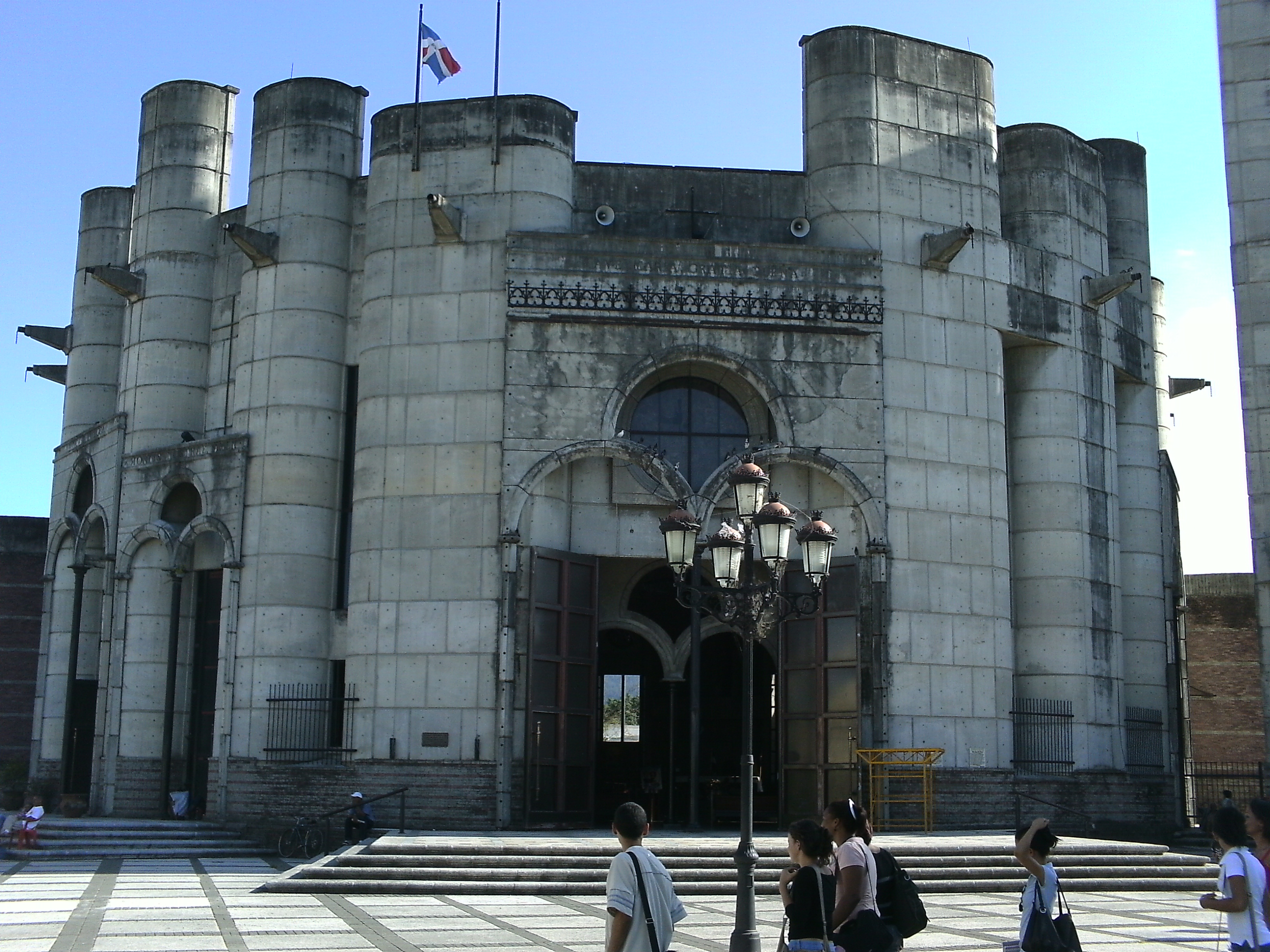
- Catedral de la Inmaculada Concepción

Location
- Country: Dominican Republic
- Ecclesiastical province: Province of Santiago de los Caballeros
- Metropolitan: Concepción de La Vega

Statistics
- Area: 4,919 km^{2} (1,899 sq mi)
- Population: Total; Catholics: (as of 2004); 880,254; 610,881 (69.4%)
- Parishes: 60

Information
- Denomination: Roman Catholic
- Rite: Latin Rite
- Established: 25 September 1953 (72 years ago)
- Cathedral: Cathedral of the Immaculate Conception

Current leadership
- Pope: Leo XIV
- Bishop: Andrés Napoleón Romero Cárdenas
- Metropolitan Archbishop: Héctor Rafael Rodríguez Rodríguez, M.S.C.
- Apostolic Administrator: José Amable Durán Tineo

Map

The Roman Catholic Diocese of La Vega (Latin: Dioecesis Vegensis) (erected 25 September 1953) is a suffragan diocese of the Archdiocese of Santiago de los Caballeros.

== Bishops ==
=== Ordinaries ===
- Francisco Panal Ramírez, O.F.M.Cap. (1956 – 1965), resigned
- Juan Antonio Flores Santana (1966 – 1992), appointed Bishop of Santiago de los Caballeros
- Gabriel Antonio Camilo González (1992 – 2015), retired
- Héctor Rafael Rodríguez Rodríguez, M.S.C. (2015 – 2023), appointed Archbishop of Santiago de los Caballeros
- Carlos Tomás Morel Diplán (2024 – 2025), appointed Coadjutor Archbishop of Santo Domingo
- Andrés Napoleón Romero Cárdenas (appointed 2026.06.12)

=== Other priests of this diocese who became bishops ===
- Nicolás de Jesús López Rodríguez, appointed Bishop of San Francisco de Macorís in 1978; future Cardinal
- Fausto Ramón Mejía Vallejo, appointed Bishop of San Francisco de Macorís in 2012
- Ramón Benito Ángeles Fernández (priest here, 1978-2002), appointed Auxiliary Bishop of Santo Domingo in 2017

== Territorial losses ==
Year	Along with	To form
1978	Diocese of Santiago de los Caballeros	Diocese of San Francisco de Macorís

== External links and references ==
- "Diocese of La Vega". Catholic-Hierarchy.
- Official website of the Diocese of La Vega
