= Diocese of Nanterre =

Catholic diocese in France

Coordinates: 48.8907°N 2.1958°E

Diocese of Nanterre Dioecesis Nemptodurensis Diocèse de Nanterre

Catholic
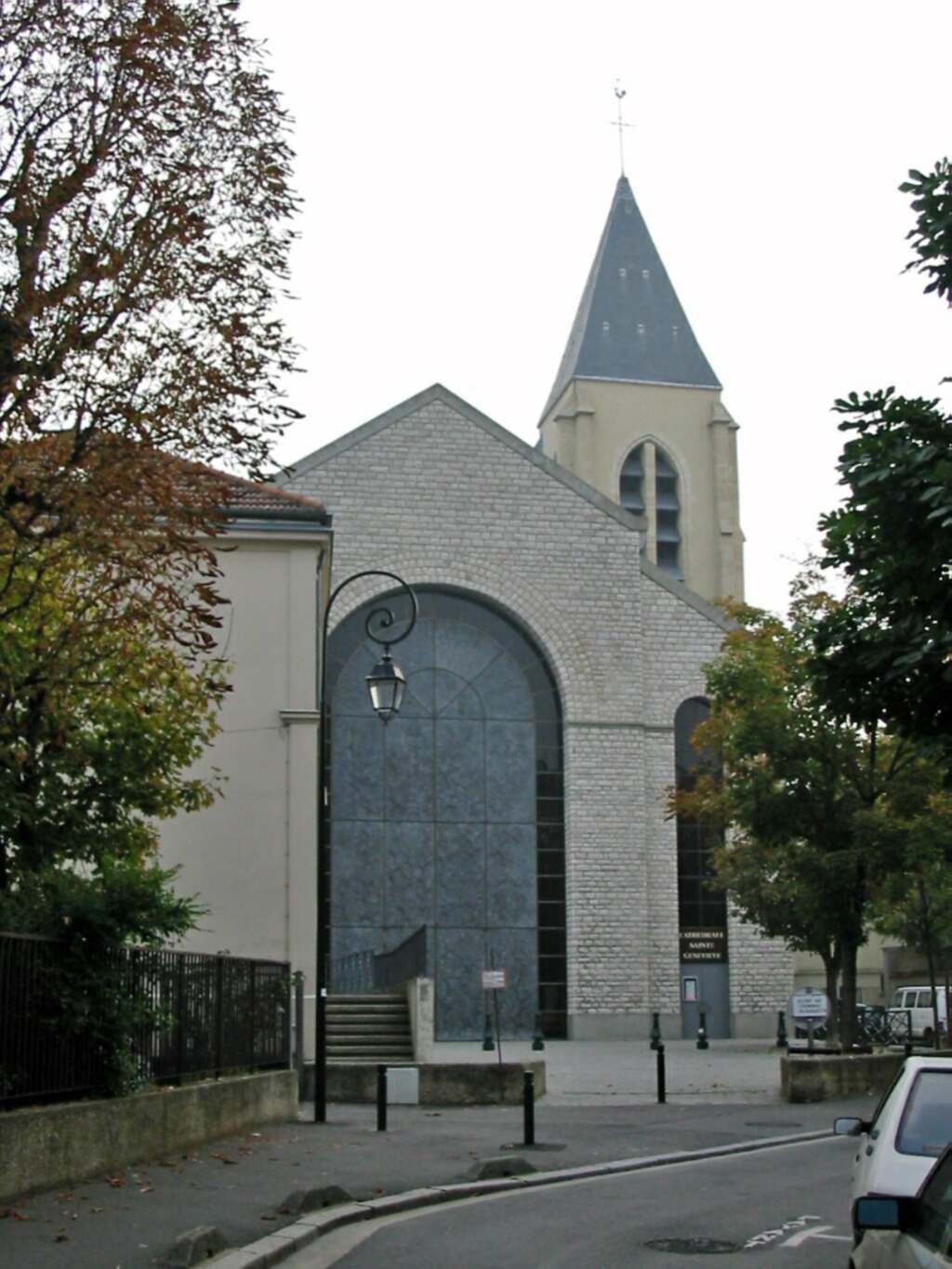
- Nanterre Cathedral

Location
- Country: France
- Ecclesiastical province: Paris
- Metropolitan: Archdiocese of Paris

Statistics
- Area: 175 km^{2} (68 sq mi)
- Population: Total; Catholics: (as of 2023); 1,625,917 ▲; 973,550 (est.) ▲ (59.9%)
- Parishes: 75 ▼

Information
- Denomination: Roman Catholic
- Sui iuris church: Latin Church
- Rite: Roman Rite
- Established: 9 October 1966
- Cathedral: Cathedral of St. Genevieve and Saint Maurice in Nanterre
- Secular priests: 160 (Diocesan) ▼98 (Religious Orders) ▲66 Permanent Deacons ▲

Current leadership
- Pope: Leo XIV
- Bishop: Matthieu Rougé
- Metropolitan Archbishop: Laurent Ulrich
- Bishops emeritus: Gérard Daucourt Bishop Emeritus (2002-2013)

Map

Website
- Website of the Diocese (in French)

The Diocese of Nanterre (Latin: Dioecesis Nemptodurensis; French: Diocèse de Nanterre) is a Latin diocese of the Catholic Church in France. Erected in 1966, the diocese was split off from the Diocese of Versailles and the Archdiocese of Paris. Currently the diocese remains a suffragan of the Archdiocese of Paris.

== History ==
=== The parish ===
In the ancien regime, the parish of Nanterre had belonged to the diocese of Paris. At the beginning of the Revolution, the Constituent Assembly decided that the number of dioceses in France was excessive, and that approximately fifty of them could be eliminated. Those that survived would have their boundaries changed to coincide with new departmental subdivisions of France. As a result of the creation of the system of "departments," Nanterre became part of the diocese of Versailles, which was called the diocese of Seine-et-Oise in the constitutional church (1791–1801).

=== Canonical establishment of diocese of Versailles ===
The French Directory fell in the coup engineered by Talleyrand and Napoleon on 10 November 1799. The coup resulted in the establishment of the French Consulate, with Napoleon as the First Consul. To advance his aggressive military foreign policy, he decided to make peace with the Catholic Church and the Papacy. In the concordat of 1801 between the French Consulate, headed by First Consul Napoleon Bonaparte, and Pope Pius VII, and in the enabling papal bull, "Qui Christi Domini", the diocese of Seine-et-Oise (Versailles) and all the other dioceses in France, were suppressed. This removed all the institutional contaminations and novelties introduced by the Constitutional Church. The diocesan structure was then re-established by the papal bull "Qui Christi Domini" of 29 November 1801, and the legitimate canonically-established diocese of Versailles was named as a suffragan diocese of the archdiocese of Paris. The Concordat was registered as a French law on 8 April 1802.

=== The diocese of Nanterre ===
In 1964, the French government created five new departments in the Île-de-France.

The diocese of Nanterre (Nemptodurensis) was created by Pope Paul VI on 9 October 1966, in the bull "Qui Volente Deo." The parish church of Saint-Geneviève was designated as the new cathedral of the diocese.

Around the 11th century, a chapel existed on the purported site of the house of Saint Geneviève's parents. During the French revolution it became a Temple of Reason, and after the Restoration it was handed back to the parish, in a dilapidated condition. In 1880 the chapel was reconstructed, and in the 1920s it was agreed that a rebuilding of the church was necessary. Extensive work was carried out between 1928 and 1937, but World War II interrupted the effort. The nave was never constructed, and, due to its hazardous condition, the west front was demolished. A new facade, just west of the transepts, was erected, leaving a large open space where the west front had been and the nave was supposed to be.

== Bishops ==
- (1966–1982) : Jacques Marie Delarue
- (1983–2002) : François-Marie-Christian Favreau
- (2002–2013) : Gérard Daucourt
- (2014–2017) : Michel Aupetit
- (2018–present) : Matthieu Rougé (5 Jun 2018 Appointed

== See also ==
- Catholic Church in France
