= Jean-Marie Lustiger =

French cardinal of the Roman Catholic Church

His Eminence Jean-Marie Aron Lustiger
- Cardinal, Archbishop of Paris
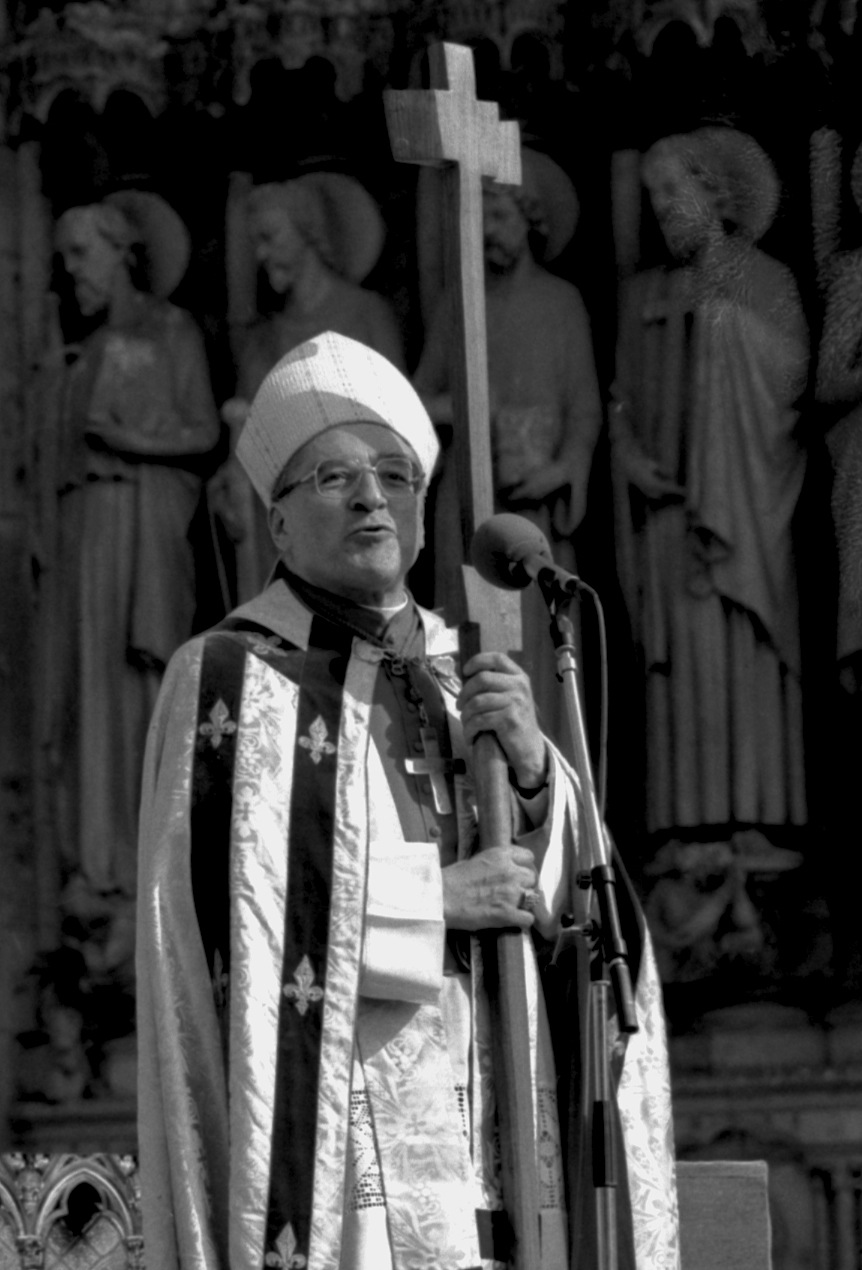
- Lustiger outside Notre Dame Cathedral, 15 August 1988
- See: Paris
- Installed: 31 January 1981
- Term ended: 11 February 2005 (retired)
- Predecessor: François Marty
- Successor: André Vingt-Trois
- Other posts: Cardinal-Priest of San Luigi dei Francesi (1994–2007); Cardinal-Priest of Santi Marcellino e Pietro (1983–1994)
- Previous post: Bishop of Orléans (1979-1981)

Orders
- Ordination: 17 April 1954 by Bishop Émile-Arsène Blanchet
- Consecration: 8 December 1979 by Cardinal François Marty
- Created cardinal: 2 February 1983 by John Paul II

Personal details
- Born: Aron Lustiger; 17 September 1926 Paris, France
- Died: 5 August 2007 (aged 80) Paris, France
- Buried: Cathedral of Notre Dame de Paris, Paris, France
- Denomination: Roman Catholic
- Parents: Charles and Gisèle Lustiger
- Coat of arms

Jean-Marie Aron Lustiger (French: [ʒɑ̃ maʁi lystiʒe]; 17 September 1926 – 5 August 2007) was a French cardinal of the Catholic Church. He served as Archbishop of Paris from 1981 until his resignation in 2005. He was made a cardinal in 1983 by Pope John Paul II. His life is depicted in the 2013 film Le métis de Dieu (The Jewish Cardinal).

== Life and work ==
=== Early years ===
Lustiger was born Aron Lustiger in Paris to a Jewish family. His parents, Charles and Gisèle Lustiger, were Ashkenazi Jews from Będzin, Poland, who had left Poland around World War I. Lustiger's father ran a hosiery shop. Aron Lustiger studied at the Lycée Montaigne in Paris, where he first encountered anti-Semitism. Visiting Germany in 1937, he was hosted by an anti-Nazi Protestant family whose children had been required to join the Hitler Youth.

Sometime between the ages of ten and twelve, Lustiger came across a Protestant Bible and felt inexplicably attracted to it. On the outbreak of World War II in September 1939, the family moved to Orléans.

In March 1940, during Holy Week, the 13-year-old Lustiger decided to convert to Catholicism. On 21 August he was baptized as Aron Jean-Marie by the Bishop of Orléans, Jules-Marie-Victor Courcoux. His sister converted later. In October 1940, the Vichy regime passed the first of many anti-Semitic laws, which forced increasingly strict conditions on Jews in the unoccupied zone.

Lustiger, his father, and sister sought refuge in unoccupied southern France, while his mother returned to Paris to run the family business. In September 1942, his mother was deported to the Auschwitz concentration camp where she was murdered the following year. The surviving family returned to Paris at the end of the war. Lustiger's father tried unsuccessfully to have his son's baptism annulled, and even sought the help of the chief rabbi of Paris.

=== Early career ===
Styles of Jean-Marie Aron Lustiger
- Reference style: His Eminence
- Spoken style: Your Eminence
- Informal style: Cardinal
- See: Paris (emeritus)

Lustiger graduated from the Sorbonne with a literature degree in 1946. He entered the seminary of the Carmelite fathers in Paris, and later the Institut Catholique de Paris. He first visited Israel in 1951. On 17 April 1954 he was ordained to the priesthood by Bishop Émile-Arsène Blanchet, rector of the Institut Catholique. From 1954 to 1959 he was a chaplain at the Sorbonne.

For the next ten years, he was the director of Richelieu Centre, which trains university chaplains and counsels lay teachers and students of the grandes écoles, graduate schools such as the ÉNS-Fontenay-Saint-Cloud or the Ecole des Chartes.

From 1969 to 1979, Lustiger was vicar of the Parish of Sainte-Jeanne-de-Chantal, in the wealthy 16th arrondissement of Paris. His parochial assistant was André Vingt-Trois, who years later would succeed him as Archbishop of Paris.

On 10 November 1979, Lustiger was appointed Bishop of Orléans by Pope John Paul II after a 15-month vacancy. John Paul had been advised by Cardinal Paolo Bertoli, who was displeased with a new illustrated Catechism for French urban youth (Pierres vivantes) and was on bad terms with most of the French clergy.

Lustiger received his episcopal consecration on 8 December 1979 from Cardinal François Marty, with Archbishop Eugène Ernoult of Sens and Bishop Daniel Pézeril serving as co-consecrators. When installed as bishop, Lustiger avoided all reference to his liberal predecessor Guy-Marie Riobé, a pacifist closely allied to Catholic Action.

=== Archbishop of Paris (1981–2005) ===
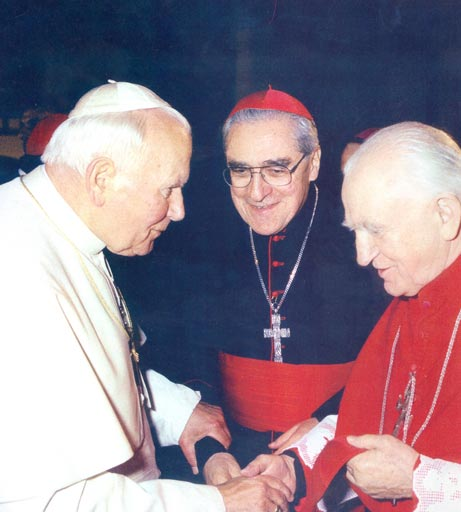
Lustiger with Pope John Paul II in Bosnia, 1997; Cardinal Franjo Kuharić on right

On 31 January 1981 Lustiger was named Archbishop of Paris, succeeding Cardinal Marty. According to Georges Suffert, he was supported by a letter to John Paul II from André Frossard. Archbishop Marcel Lefebvre, the founder of the Traditionalist Catholic group Society of Saint Pius X, criticized his nomination. He said that the position was being given to "someone who is not truly of French origin". Liberal French clergy considered Lustiger's nomination a defeat for them.

Lustiger was considered a first-rate communicator and he was a personal friend of Jean Gélamur, head of the Catholic media group Bayard Presse. The new archbishop was particularly attentive to the media; he developed Catholic radio and television channels (Radio Notre-Dame) after François Mitterrand's liberalization of French media in 1981. He founded KTO TV in 1999, which struggled financially. Lustiger also founded a new seminary for training priests, bypassing the existing arrangements.

He was considered, primarily by his critics, to be authoritarian, earning him the nickname of "Bulldozer". Lustiger deposed the vicars general Michel Guittet and Pierre Gervaise, had Georges Gilson transferred to Le Mans and Emile Marcus to Nantes, personally headed the meetings of the episcopal council, and made numerous other changes. He dismantled P. Béguerie's team in Saint-Séverin. In October 1981, the French bishops elected the more liberal Jean-Félix-Albert-Marie Vilnet as President of the Episcopal Conference, with whom Lustiger was on difficult terms throughout his life. In 1982, he invited for the celebration of Lent in Notre-Dame Roger Etchegaray (whom he disliked at first) and the Jesuit Roger Heckel. He participated in the annual meeting of the movement Comunione e Liberazione in Rimini in summer 1982. In January 1983 he invited Cardinal Joseph Ratzinger to Notre-Dame de Paris, where the latter criticized new catechisms proposed by a large part of the French clergy.

He was incardinated Cardinal-Priest of Santi Marcellino e Pietro by Pope John Paul II in the consistory of 2 February 1983, at the same time as the Jesuit theologian Henri de Lubac. On 26 November 1994, he was named Cardinal-Priest of San Luigi dei Francesi. As a cardinal, Lustiger began to attract international attention. He was considered papabile, (i.e. having good chances of being elected pope). Certain Catholic circles interpreted the Prophecy of Malachy in reference to him as a Jewish Pope.

Lustiger carried out several reforms in the Archdiocese of Paris concerning priests' training, creating in 1984 an independent theological faculty in the École cathédrale de Paris, distinct from the Catholic University of Paris aka Institut Catholique de Paris (ICP). He constructed seven new churches in Paris. In addition, he supported the development of charismatic movements, such as the Emmanuel Community (of which he was in charge until June 2006) and the Chemin Neuf Community. The latter was recognized in 1984 by the Vatican as an International Association of the Faithful. Some parishes were entrusted to charismatic movements. In Paris, he ordained 200 priests; they represented 15 percent of the French total, and were drawn from a diocese which had two per cent of the French population. Strongly attached to the ideal of priestly celibacy, Lustiger used his position as Ordinary for Orientals to prevent the deployment of married Eastern Rite Catholic priests in France. He favoured development of a permanent diaconate, to be filled mainly by married men involved in the workplace.

In 1984, Lustiger led a mass rally at Versailles in opposition to the Savary Law, which reduced state aid to private (which was mostly Catholic) education. He was seen to surpass his comrades Jean Vilnet, Paul Guiberteau and Jean Honoré, who were leaders on the issue. Shortly afterwards Alain Savary had to resign. This opposition cemented Lustiger's relations with the groups supporting private education, from whose midst he was to draw most of his candidates for the priesthood. He supported the 1905 Law on the Separation of Church and State, but, when testifying before the Commission Stasi on secularism, he opposed the 2004 French law on secularity, which limited conspicuous religious symbols in schools.

Lustiger had his right-hand man, André Vingt-Trois, appointed bishop in 1988. Following Marcel Lefebvre's schism in June 1988, Lustiger tried to reduce tensions with the Traditionalist Catholics, celebrating a Tridentine Mass and sending conservative priest Patrick Le Gal as his emissary to Lefebvre. Along with Cardinal Albert Decourtray, he strongly criticised Martin Scorsese's The Last Temptation of Christ in 1988, clashing with the liberal bishop Jacques Gaillot.

Along with his clerical contacts, Lustiger maintained contacts with the political world. He developed rather good working relations with François Mitterrand's Socialist government, despite their political disagreements. During the celebrations of the second centenary of the French Revolution in 1989, he opposed Minister of Culture Jack Lang on the Pantheonization of the Abbé Grégoire, one of the first priests to take the oath on the Civil Constitution of the Clergy. For this, he was criticized by the liberal Catholic review Golias. He deposed the priest Alain Maillard de La Morandais from his diplomatic functions toward the political sphere, as he considered him to be too pro-Balladur during the 1995 presidential campaign. Lustiger, as Archbishop of Paris, presided over Mitterrand's funeral.

Lustiger's search for dialogue with politicians led to his founding in 1992 of the Centre Pastoral d'Etudes politiques at St. Clotilde church in the 7th arrondissement, close to the hub of the French establishment. He sought to identify and conciliate rising national élites in politics and communication. He was less amenable to initiatives from non-French Catholic groups or individuals (their position was inconclusively debated at the Diocesan Synod).

Relations with the cultural sphere were promoted by a series of Lenten Sermons at Notre-Dame (into which dialogue with prominent French intellectuals and state-employed academics were introduced) and by plans for the opening of the Centre St. Bernard in the 5th arrondissement.

Lustiger was never elected as head of the French Episcopal Conference by his peers, with whom he was not popular. He was elected a member of the Académie française in 1995, succeeding Albert Decourtray and bypassing Cardinal Paul Poupard. Two years later, he organized a World Youth Day in Paris, attended by more than a million people.

=== Theology and ethics ===
Lustiger upheld papal authority in theology and morals: "There are opinions and there is faith," he said in 1997. "When it is faith, I agree with the Pope because I am responsible for the faith." Cardinal Lustiger was a strong believer in priestly celibacy and opposed abortion and the ordination of women. Although he fully endorsed John Paul II's views on bioethics, he considered condom use acceptable if one of the partners had HIV. He founded the Non-Governmental Organization Tibériade to attend to AIDS patients.

He considered Christianity to be the accomplishment of Judaism, and the New Testament to be the logical continuation of the Old Testament. In Le Choix de Dieu (The Choice of God, 1987), he declared that modern anti-Semitism was the product of the Enlightenment, whose philosophy he attacked.

He read the Thomistic philosophers Étienne Gilson and Jacques Maritain—one of the main Catholic thinkers of his youth—as well as Jean Guitton, but also the Protestant philosopher Paul Ricœur, and Maurice Clavel, and the existentialist philosopher Jean-Paul Sartre. Close to Augustinism, he preferred the post-conciliar theologian Louis Bouyer to the (pre-conciliar) neo-Thomist Reginald Garrigou-Lagrange. His main influence was Henri de Lubac, as well as the Jesuits Albert and Paul Chapelle. Lustiger, unlike other leading twentieth-century French bishops, did not draw noticeably on patristic writings and was more sensitive to rabbinic texts.

When appointed to Paris he encouraged some liberal clergy to return to the lay state. He was influential in the appointment of his moderate conciliar auxiliary Georges Gilson to the See of Le Mans, replacing senior clergy with men who shared similar views to his own.

He pursued ecumenism but also gave a critical address on Anglicanism when welcoming Archbishop Robert Runcie to Notre Dame. In 1995, Lustiger played a key role in deposing the liberal bishop of Évreux, Jacques Gaillot, who was then transferred to the titular see of Partenia.

Lustiger was an outspoken opponent of racism and anti-Semitism. He was strongly critical of Jean-Marie Le Pen, leader of the French National Front, comparing Le Pen's xenophobic views to Nazism. "We have known for 50 years that the theory of racial inequality can be deadly. ...It entails outrages." He also said: "The Christian faith says that all men are equal in dignity because they are all created in the image of God." He supported the action of the parish priest of St. Bernard-de-la-Chapelle in accepting the protracted sit-in of a group of undocumented immigrants in 1996, but subsequently showed less sympathy to such activities. The police were called to a similar sit-in at St. Merry.

He incurred the hostility of some in the Spanish Church because he strongly opposed the project to canonize Queen Isabella I of Castile. In 1974, Pope Paul VI had opened her cause for beatification, which placed her on the path toward possible sainthood. Lustiger's opposition was due to the fact that Isabella and her husband Ferdinand of Aragon had expelled Jews from her domains in 1492.

Lustiger was a favorite of Pope John Paul II. He had a Polish background and staunchly upheld the Pope's conservative views in the face of much hostility from liberal Catholic opinion in France. This led to some speculation that Lustiger would be a candidate to succeed John Paul II, but he always refused to discuss any such possibility. He was one of the cardinal electors who participated in the 2005 papal conclave that elected Pope Benedict XVI.

=== Relations with the Jewish world ===
Along with Cardinal Francis Arinze and Bishop Jean-Baptiste Gourion of Jerusalem, Lustiger was one of only three prelates of his time who were converts to the Catholic faith; he and Gourion were the only two who were born Jewish and still considered themselves "Jewish" all their lives. He said he was proud of his Jewish origins and described himself as a "fulfilled Jew", for which he was chastised by Christians and Jews alike. Former Chief Ashkenazi Rabbi of Israel Yisrael Meir Lau publicly denounced Lustiger. Lau accused Lustiger of betraying the Jewish people by converting to Catholicism, alongside another rabbi who accused him of causing more harm than Adolf Hitler by converting to Christianity. Lustiger, who claimed that he was still a Jew, considered being "Jewish" as an ethnic designation and not exclusively a religious one. Lustiger's strong support for the State of Israel, conflicting with the Vatican's officially neutral position, also won him Jewish support.

On becoming Archbishop of Paris, Lustiger said:

I was born Jewish and so I remain, even if that is unacceptable for many. For me, the vocation of Israel is bringing light to the goyim. That is my hope and I believe that Christianity is the means for achieving it.

The former chief rabbi of France, Rabbi René Samuel Sirat, says he personally witnessed Lustiger entering the synagogue to recite kaddish—the Jewish mourners' prayer—for his mother.

Cardinal Lustiger gained recognition after negotiating in 1987 with representatives of the organized Jewish community (including Théo Klein, the former president of the CRIF) the departure of the Carmelite nuns who built a convent in Auschwitz concentration camp (see Auschwitz cross). He represented Pope John Paul II in January 2005 during the 60th-year commemoration of the liberation of Auschwitz camp by the Allies. He was also in Birkenau along with the new Pope Benedict XVI in May 2006.

In 1995, Cardinal Lustiger attended the reading of an act of repentance with a group of French rabbis, during which Catholic authorities apologized for the French Church's passive attitude towards the collaborationism policies enacted by the Vichy regime during World War II.

In 1998, Lustiger was awarded the Nostra Aetate Award for advancing Catholic-Jewish relations by the Center for Christian-Jewish Understanding, an interfaith group housed on the campus of Sacred Heart University, a Catholic university at Fairfield, Connecticut, in the United States. The Anti-Defamation League, a Jewish civil rights group, protested the award, saying it was "inappropriate" to honor Lustiger, who was born a Jew but left the faith. "It's fine to have him speak at a conference or colloquium," said the league's national director Abraham Foxman. "But I don't think he should be honored because he converted out, which makes him a poor example." In France, however, Lustiger enjoyed good relations with the Jewish community. Théo Klein observed that although conversions usually carry negative connotations in the Jewish world, it was not so with the Cardinal. Klein called Lustiger "his cousin".

In 2004 and 2006, Lustiger visited New York and included visits to the Bobover Rebbe (who blessed him), Yeshiva University, JTSA, and Yeshivat Chovevei Torah where he addressed the students and faculty along with fellow visiting European bishops.

The World Jewish Congress paid homage to him after his death.

== Public lectures ==
In 1996, Lustiger delivered the tenth Erasmus Lecture, titled Liberty, Equality, Fraternity, sponsored by First Things magazine and the Institute on Religion and Public Life. In his address, Lustiger reflected on the legacy of the French Revolution’s ideals and their relationship to Christian conceptions of freedom, equality, and human solidarity. He argued that the moral and spiritual renewal of Western society depends on recovering the transcendent foundations of these principles.

=== Retirement and death ===
When Lustiger reached the age of 75 on 17 September 2001, he submitted his resignation as Archbishop of Paris to Pope John Paul II, as required by canon law. The Pope kept it on file for some years. But on 11 February 2005, Lustiger's resignation was accepted and André Vingt-Trois, a former auxiliary bishop of Paris who had become Archbishop of Tours, succeeded him as Archbishop of Paris.

Lustiger made his final public appearance in January 2007. He died on 5 August 2007 at a clinic outside Paris where he had been battling bone and lung cancer since April.

The funeral, presided over by Cardinal Lustiger's successor, was held at Notre Dame Cathedral on 10 August 2007. French President Nicolas Sarkozy, on vacation in the United States, returned to attend Lustiger's funeral. In homage to Lustiger's Jewish heritage, the Kaddish — the traditional hymn of praise of God's name — was recited by his cousin Arno Lustiger in front of the portal of the cathedral.

Lustiger's epitaph, which he wrote himself in 2004, can be seen in the crypt of Notre-Dame Cathedral, and translates as:

I was born Jewish.
I received the name
Of my paternal grandfather, Aron.
Having become Christian
By faith and by Baptism,
I have remained Jewish
As did the Apostles.
I have as my patron saints
Aron the High Priest,
Saint John the Apostle,
Holy Mary full of grace.
Named 139th archbishop of Paris
by His Holiness Pope John Paul II,
I was enthroned in this Cathedral
on 27 February 1981,
And here I exercised my entire ministry.
Passers-by, pray for me.

† Aron Jean-Marie Cardinal Lustiger
Archbishop of Paris

== Distinctions ==
- Lebanon: Grand cordon of the National Order of the Cedar
- Sovereign Military Order of Malta: Bailli Grand Cross of Honour and Devotion of the Sovereign Military Order of Malta
- Portugal: Grand Cross of the Order of Prince Henry

== Auxiliaries ==
The following bishops served as auxiliaries in the Paris diocese under Cardinal Lustiger.

- Daniel Pézeril
- Georges Gilson
- Emile Marcus
- Claude Fricard
- André Vingt-Trois
- Éric Aumonier
- Michel Pollien

== Published works ==
- Sermons d'un curé de Paris (1978)
- Pain de vie et peuple de Dieu (1981)
- Osez croire (1985)
- Osez vivre (1985)
- Premiers pas dans la prière (1986)
- Prenez place au cœur de l'Église (1986)
- Six sermons aux élus de la Nation, 1981-1986 (1987)
- Le Choix de Dieu. Entretiens avec Jean-Louis Missika et Dominique Wolton (1987)
- La Messe (1988)
- Dieu merci, les droits de l'homme (1990)
- Le Sacrement de l'onction des malades (1990)
- Le Saint-Ayoul de Jeanclos (in collaboration with Alain Peyrefitte, 1990)
- Nous avons rendez-vous avec l'Europe (1991)
- Dare to rejoice (American compilation) (1991)
- Petites paroles de nuit de Noël (1992)
- Devenez dignes de la condition humaine (1995)
- Henri de Lubac et le mystère de l'Eglise : actes du colloque du 12 octobre 1996 à l'Institut de France (1999)
- Le Baptême de votre enfant (1997)
- Soyez heureux (1997)
- Pour l'Europe, un nouvel art de vivre (1999)
- Les prêtres que Dieu donne (2000)
- Comme Dieu vous aime. Un pèlerinage à Jérusalem, Rome et Lourdes (2001)
- La Promesse (2002)
- Comment Dieu ouvre la porte de la foi (2004)
- Cardinal Jean-Marie Lustiger on Christians and Jews (2010)

== See also ==
- Jacques Fesch

Catholic Church titles
Preceded by François Marty	Archbishop of Paris; 31 January 1981 – 11 February 2005	Succeeded by André Vingt-Trois
