= Roque Antonio Adames Rodríguez =

Roman Catholic bishop

- Bishop of Santiago de los Caballeros
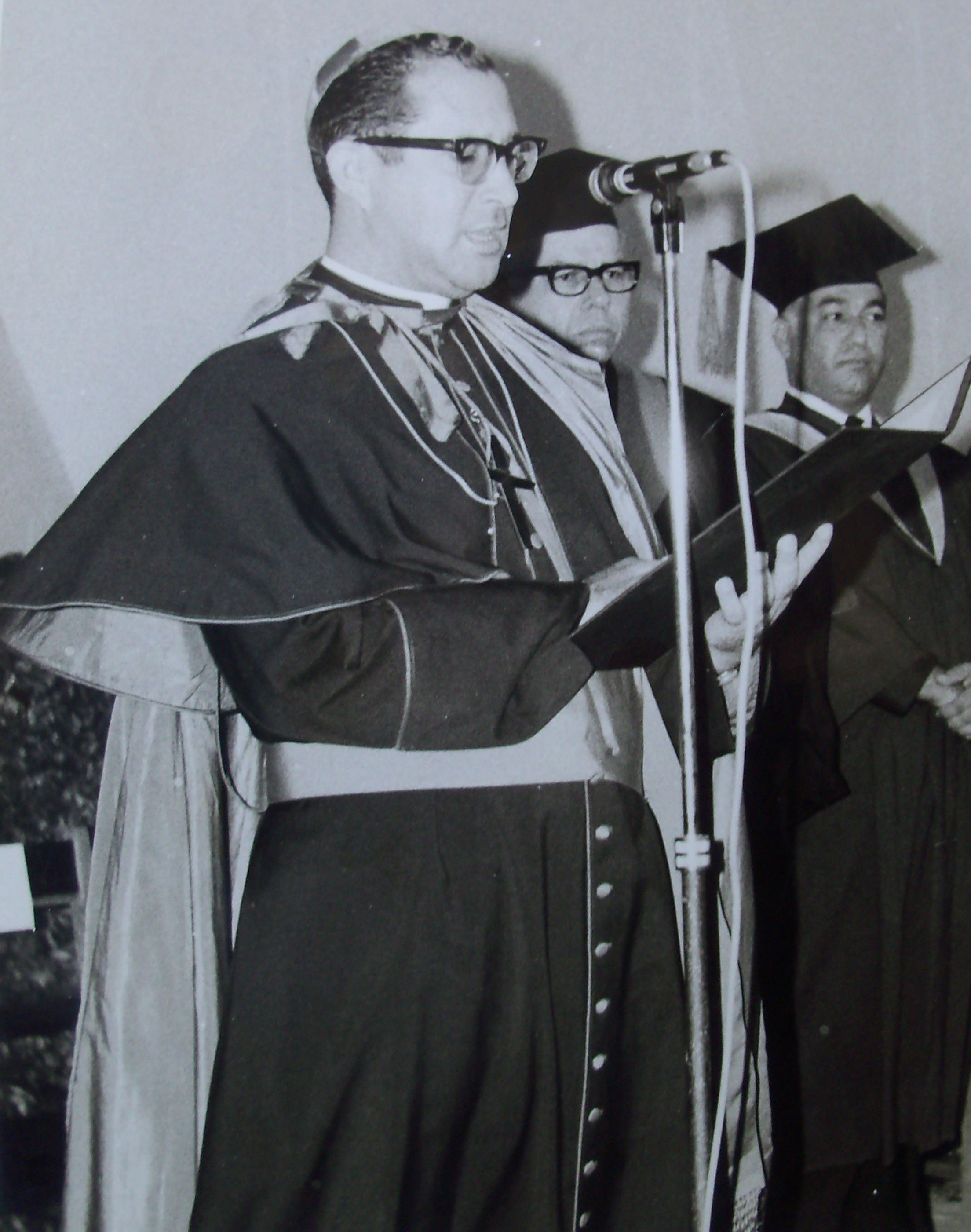
- Church: Catholic Church
- Diocese: Diocese of Santiago de los Caballeros
- In office: 14 March 1966 – 22 April 1922
- Predecessor: Hugo Eduardo Polanco Brito
- Successor: Juan Antonio Flores Santana

Orders
- Ordination: 17 April 1954
- Consecration: 22 May 1966 by Octavio Beras Rojas

Personal details
- Born: 8 November 1928 Jánico, Santiago Province, Dominican Republic
- Died: 31 October 2009 (aged 80)

Roque Antonio Adames Rodríguez (8 November 1928 – 31 October 2009) was Catholic bishop of what is now the Archdiocese of Santiago de los Caballeros, Dominican Republic.

Ordained on 17 April 1954, Pope Paul VI appointed Adames Rodríguez bishop and he was ordained on 22 May 1966, resigning on 22 April 1992.
