= St. James the Apostle Cathedral, Santiago de los Caballeros =

Santiago the Apostle Cathedral
- Catedral de Santiago Apóstol
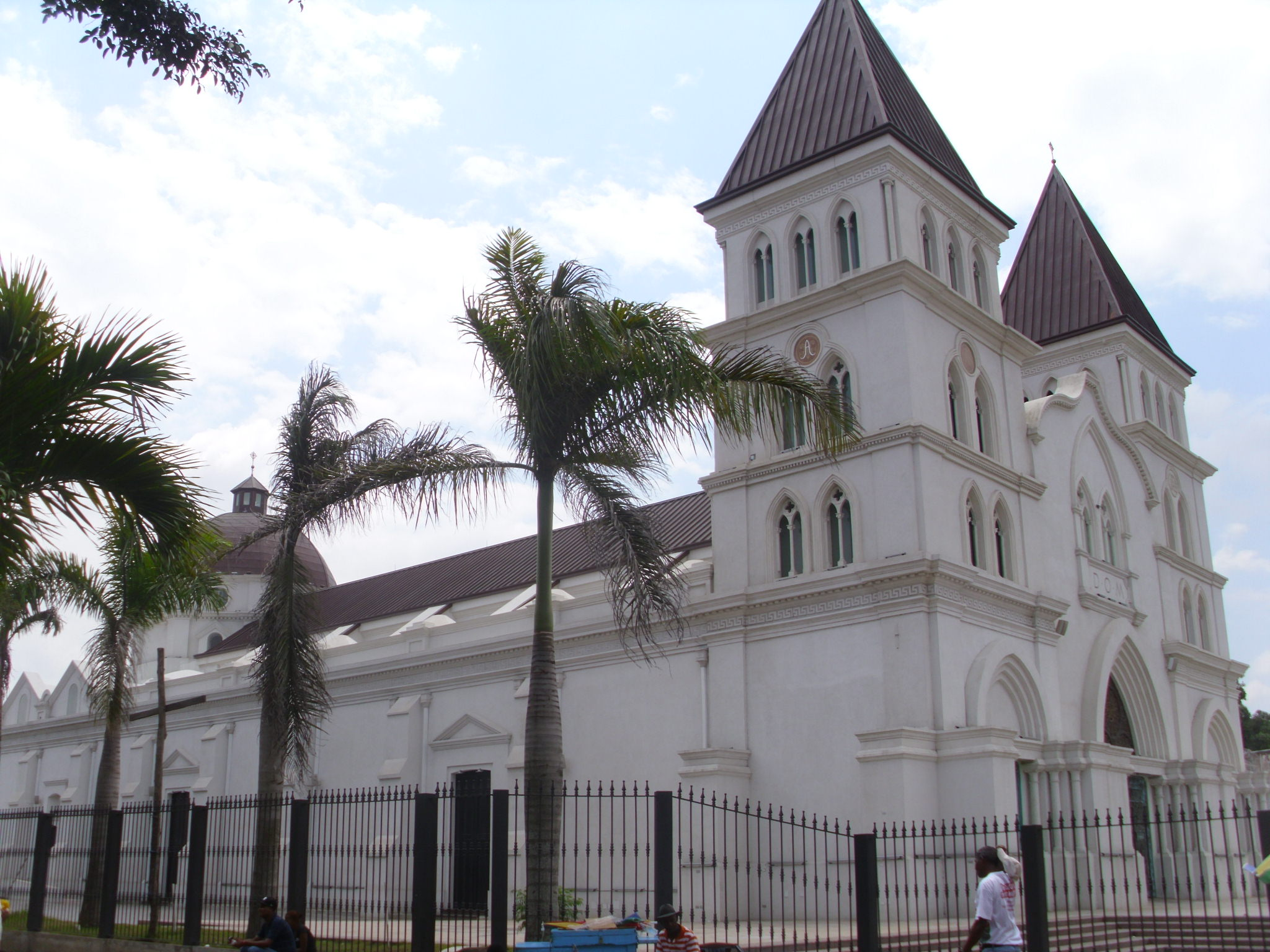
- Santiago the Apostle Cathedral
- 19.45023°N 70.70670°W
- Location: Calle 30 de marzo, Santiago de los Caballeros
- Country: Dominican Republic
- Denomination: Roman Catholic Church

History
- Consecrated: 1895

Architecture
- Style: Eclectic architecture
- Years built: 1868–1894

Administration
- Archdiocese: Roman Catholic Archdiocese of Santiago de los Caballeros

The St. James the Apostle Cathedral (also Santiago de los Caballeros Cathedral; Spanish: Catedral de Santiago Apóstol) is a Catholic church located in the city of Santiago de los Caballeros, the capital of Santiago Province in the Dominican Republic. It was baptized thus in honor of St. James the Greater, the disciple of Jesus, the son of Zebedee and Salome.

== Background ==
It began as a parochial church that was destroyed by an earthquake in 1842. The present structure was built between 1868 and 1894 and consecrated in 1895. It suffered delays in its construction due to lack of funds. It was briefly used as a fortress in the so-called "war of restoration" (Guerra de Restauración).

The eclectic-style temple follows the Roman or Latin rite and is the mother church of the Archdiocese of Santiago de los Caballeros (Archidioecesis Sancti Iacobi Equitum) which was created as a diocese in 1953 by Pope Pius XII by the bull Si magna et excelsa and elevated to its current status by the bull Solicitam sane curam of 1994 by Pope John Paul II.

It is under the pastoral responsibility of Archbishop Freddy Antonio de Jesús Bretón Martínez.

== See also ==
- Roman Catholicism in the Dominican Republic
- St. James the Apostle
