= Daniel Pézeril =

French priest

Daniel Pézeril (5 October 1911 in La Serena, Chile – 22 April 1998 in Paris) was the Roman Catholic auxiliary bishop of Paris in the time of Cardinal François Marty. Before this he had been Curé of Saint-Séverin, a parish known for its liturgical role in the years preceding Vatican II. The author of several spiritual works, he was also keenly involved in dialogue with non-believers, and in particular was known to be open to currents in French freemasonry. Pézeril is believed also to have played a key role in the decision to appoint Jean-Marie Lustiger as archbishop of Paris.
