= Héctor Rafael Rodríguez Rodríguez =

20 & 21st century Dominican Roman Catholic Archbishop

His Excellency, The Most Reverend, Mons. Don. Héctor Rafael Rodríguez Rodríguez, M.S.C.
- Metropolitan Archbishop of Santiago de los Caballeros
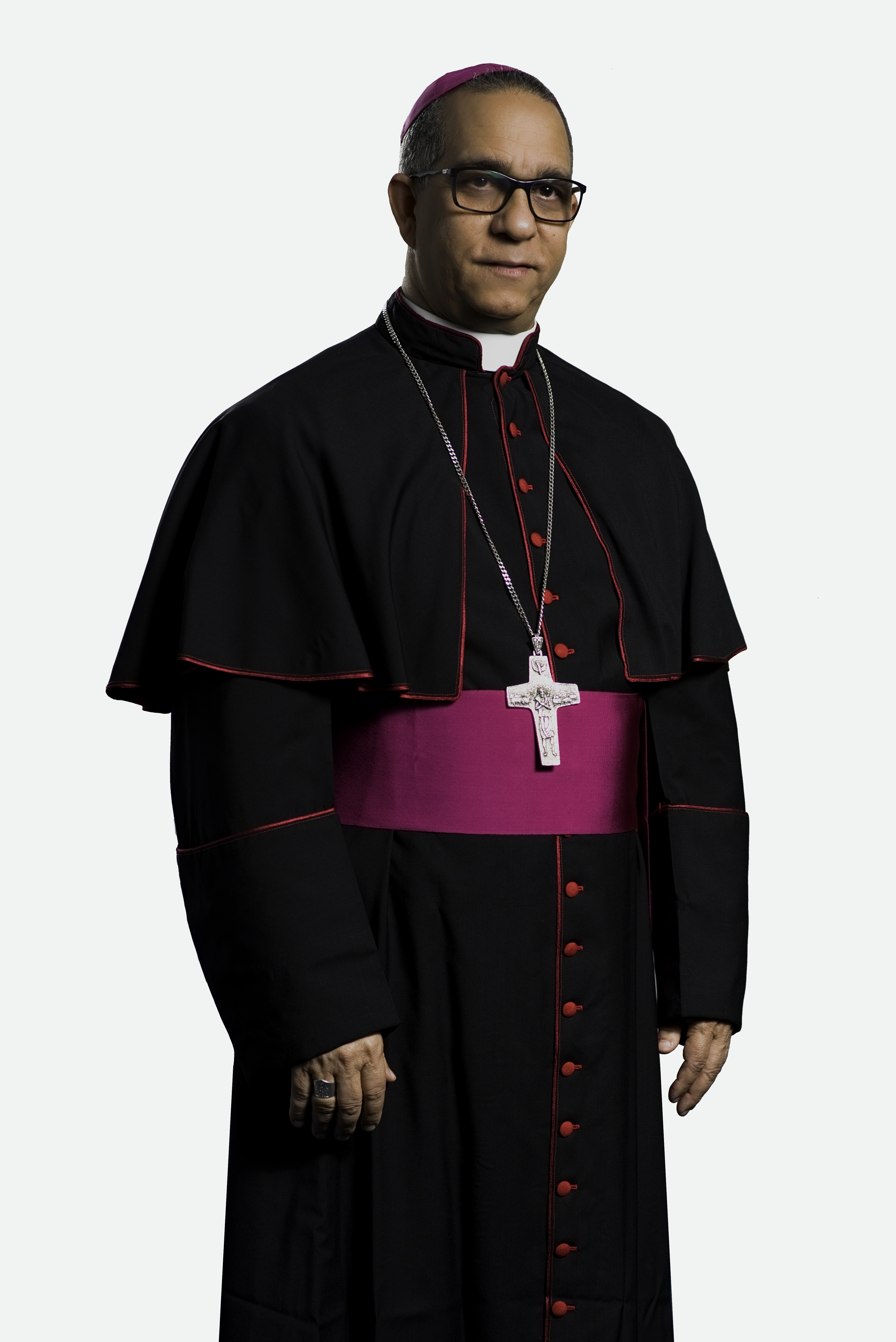
- Church: Roman Catholic Church
- Archdiocese: Santiago de los Caballeros
- Province: Santiago de los Caballeros
- Metropolis: Santiago de los Caballeros
- Diocese: Santiago de los Caballeros
- Appointed: October 2023
- Previous post: Bishop of La Vega (2015-2023)

Orders
- Consecration: May 2015 by Nicolás de Jesús López Rodríguez
- Rank: Metropolitan Archbishop

Personal details
- Born: Héctor Rafael Rodríguez Rodríguez; 13 January 1961 (age 65) Samana, Dominican Republic
- Denomination: Catholic Church
- Occupation: Archbishop, Prelate
- Education: Pontifical Gregorian University
- Motto: Manso y humilde
- Coat of arms: Don. Héctor Rafael Rodríguez Rodríguez, M.S.C.'s coat of arms

His Excellency, The Most Reverend, Mons. Don. Héctor Rafael Rodríguez Rodríguez, M.S.C. (born 13 January 1961) is a Dominican prelate of the Catholic Church and professed member of the Missionaries of the Sacred Heart. He is metropolitan archbishop of Roman Catholic Archdiocese of Santiago de los Caballeros since October 2023. He previously served as Bishop of La Vega (2015-2023).

== Biography ==
Born in 1961, he entered the vocational centre of the Missionaries of the Sacred Heart. He professed his vows in 1984, and received his ordination as priest in 1989. He earned his licentiate degree in theology from the Pontifical Gregorian University in Rome. In 1991 he was appointed parish vicar of San Jose de las Matas. In 1992 he became director of the aspirantate of the vocational centre in his religious congregation. In 1994 he was named director of the post-novitiate. In 2001 he became master of novices. In 2006 he became provincial in Dominican Republic. In 2012 he was appointed member of the executive body of the Dominican Conference of Men Religious and first counsellor of the Congregation of Missionaries of the Sacred Heart in Rome. On 23 February 2015, Pope Francis named him Bishop of La Vega and received episcopal ordination the following 9 May. In 2017 he was elected vice president of the Dominican Episcopal Conference, of which he became president in 2023. In October 2023 he was named metropolitan archbishop of Roman Catholic Archdiocese of Santiago de los Caballeros.
