= Archdiocese of Santiago de los Caballeros =

Roman Catholic archdiocese in the Dominican Republic

Coordinates: 19°27′01″N 70°42′24″W

Metropolitan Archdiocese of Santiago de los Caballeros Archidioecesis Metropolitae Sancti Iacobi Equitum

Catholic

Location
- Country: Dominican Republic
- Ecclesiastical province: Province of Santiago de los Caballeros
- Metropolitan: Santiago de los Caballeros

Statistics
- Area: 6,391 km^{2} (2,468 sq mi)
- Population: Total; Catholics: (as of 2004); 1,065,886; 870,635 (81.7%)
- Parishes: 86

Information
- Denomination: Roman Catholic
- Rite: Latin Rite
- Established: 25 September 1953 (73 years ago)
- Cathedral: Cathedral of St. James the Apostle

Current leadership
- Pope: Leo XIV
- Archbishop: Héctor Rafael Rodríguez Rodríguez
- Metropolitan Archbishop: Héctor Rafael Rodríguez Rodríguez
- Auxiliary Bishops: Carlos Tomás Morel Diplán; Andrés Amaury Rosario Henriquez
- Bishops emeritus: Ramón Benito de la Rosa y Carpio; Valentin Reynoso Hidalgo, M.S.C. Freddy Antonio de Jesús Bretón Martínez (appointed by Pope Francis on Saturday, 23 February 2015; formerly, Bishop of the Roman Catholic Diocese of Baní, in Bani, Dominican Republic)

Map

The Roman Catholic Metropolitan Archdiocese of Santiago de los Caballeros (Latin: Archidioecesis Metropolitae Sancti Iacobi Equitum) is a Latin Rite Metropolitan Archdiocese in the Dominican Republic.

== History ==
- Established on 25 September 1953 as the Diocese of Santiago de los Caballeros / Sancti Iacobi Equitum (Latin adjective), on territory split off from Roman Catholic Archdiocese of Santo Domingo
- Lost territories on 1978-01-16 to establish two suffragan daughters, Diocese of Mao–Monte Cristi and Diocese of San Francisco de Macorís
- Promoted on 14 February 1994 as Metropolitan Archdiocese of Santiago de los Caballeros / Sancti Iacobi Equitum (Latin)
- Lost territory again on 1996-12-16 to establish another suffragan daughter, the Diocese of Puerto Plata.

== Statistics ==
As per 2014, it pastorally served 1,118,000 Catholics (83.7% of 1,336,000 total) on 3,633 km² in 89 parishes and 17 missions with 125 priests (74 diocesan, 51 religious), 132 deacons, 350 lay religious (136 brothers, 214 sisters) and 37 seminarians.

== Ecclesiastical province ==
The Metropolitan has the following suffragan sees :

- Roman Catholic Diocese of La Vega
- Roman Catholic Diocese of Mao-Monte Cristi
- Roman Catholic Diocese of Puerto Plata
- Roman Catholic Diocese of San Francisco de Macorís.

== Bishops ==
(all Roman Rite)

=== Episcopal ordinaries ===
==== Suffragan Bishops of Santiago de los Caballeros ====
- Apostolic Administrator Octavio Antonio Beras Rojas (1953 – 1956-07-22) while Titular Archbishop of Euchaitæ (1945-05-02 – 1961-12-10) and Coadjutor Archbishop of Santo Domingo (Dominican Republic) (1945-05-02 – 1961-12-10)
- Hugo Eduardo Polanco Brito (1956-07-22 – 1966-03-14)
- Roque Antonio Adames Rodríguez (1966.03.14 – 1992-04-22)
  - Auxiliary bishop Jesús María de Jesús Moya (1977-04-13 – 1984-04-20)
- Juan Antonio Flores Santana (1992-07-13 – 1994-02-14 see below)

==== Metropolitan Archbishops of Santiago de los Caballeros ====
- Juan Antonio Flores Santana (see above 1994-02-14 - 2003-07-16)
  - Auxiliary bishop Diómedes Espinal de León (2000-04-20 – 2006.05-24)
- Ramón Benito de La Rosa y Carpio (2003-07-16 – 2015-02-23)
- Freddy Antonio de Jesús Bretón Martínez (2015-02-23 – ...)
  - Auxiliary bishop Valentin Reynoso Hidalgo, (M.S.C.), (2007-10-22 – ...) Titular Bishop of Mades
  - Auxiliary Bishop Carlos Tomás Morel Diplán, (2016-12-14 – ...) Titular Bishop of Capo della Foresta
- Héctor Rafael Rodríguez Rodríguez, (2023 - present)

=== Auxiliary bishops ===
- Hugo Eduardo Polanco Brito (1953-1956), appointed Bishop here
- Jesús María de Jesús Moya (1977-1984), appointed Bishop of San Francisco de Macorís
- Diómedes Espinal de León(2000-2006), appointed Bishop of Mao-Monte Cristi
- Valentín Reynoso Hidalgo, M.S.C. (2007-2018)
- Carlos Tomás Morel Diplán (since 2016)
- Andrés Amaury Rosario Henriquez (since 2025)

=== Other priests of this diocese who became bishops ===
- Gregorio Nicanor Peña Rodríguez, appointed Bishop of Puerto Plata in 1996
- José Amable Durán Tineo, appointed auxiliary bishop of Santo Domingo in 2020

== See also ==
- List of Catholic dioceses in the Dominican Republic

== Sources and external links ==
- GCatholic - data for all sections
- Official website of the Archdiocese of Santiago de los Caballeros
- "Archdiocese of Santiago de los Caballeros". Catholic-Hierarchy.
- Conferencia del Episcopado Dominicano (Bishops' Conference)
