= Diocese of San Francisco de Macorís =

Roman Catholic diocese in the Dominican Republic

Diocese of San Francisco de Macorís Dioecesis Sancti Francisci de Macoris
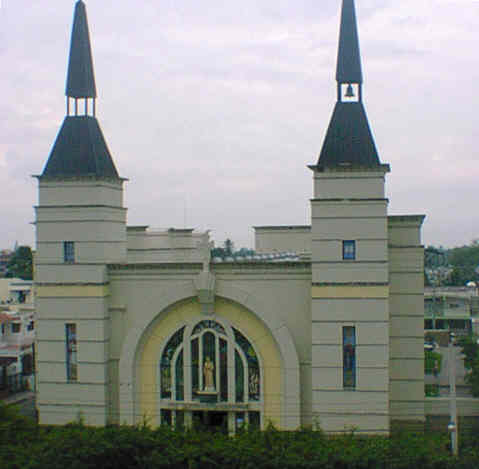
- Catedral Santa Ana

Location
- Country: Dominican Republic
- Ecclesiastical province: Province of Santiago de los Caballeros
- Metropolitan: San Francisco de Macorís

Statistics
- Area: 3,682 km^{2} (1,422 sq mi)
- Population: Total; Catholics: (as of 2010); 743,000; 591,000 (79.5%)
- Parishes: 48

Information
- Denomination: Roman Catholic
- Rite: Latin Rite
- Established: 16 January 1978 (48 years ago)
- Cathedral: Cathedral of St. Ann

Current leadership
- Pope: Leo XIV
- Bishop: Ramón Alfredo de la Cruz Baldera
- Bishops emeritus: Fausto Ramón Mejía Vallejo

Map

The Roman Catholic Diocese of San Francisco de Macorís (Latin: Dioecesis Sancti Francisci de Macoris) (erected 16 January 1978) is a suffragan diocese of the Archdiocese of Santiago de los Caballeros.

== Bishops ==
Ordinaries

- Nicolás de Jesús López Rodríguez (16 January 1978 – 15 November 1981)
- Jesús María de Jesús Moya (20 April 1984 – 31 May 2012)
- Fausto Ramón Mejía Vallejo (31 May 2012 – 15 May 2021)
- Ramón Alfredo de la Cruz Baldera (15 May 2021 – present)

Other priests of this diocese who became bishops

- Julio César Corniel Amaro, appointed Bishop of Puerto Plata in 2005
- Andrés Napoleón Romero Cárdenas, appointed Bishop of Barahona in 2015
- Francisco Ozoria Acosta, appointed Archbishop of Santo Domingo in 2016

== External links and references ==
- "Diocese of San Francisco de Macorís". Catholic-Hierarchy.
