= Juan Antonio Flores Santana =

Catholic clergyman

- Archbishop of Santiago de los Caballeros
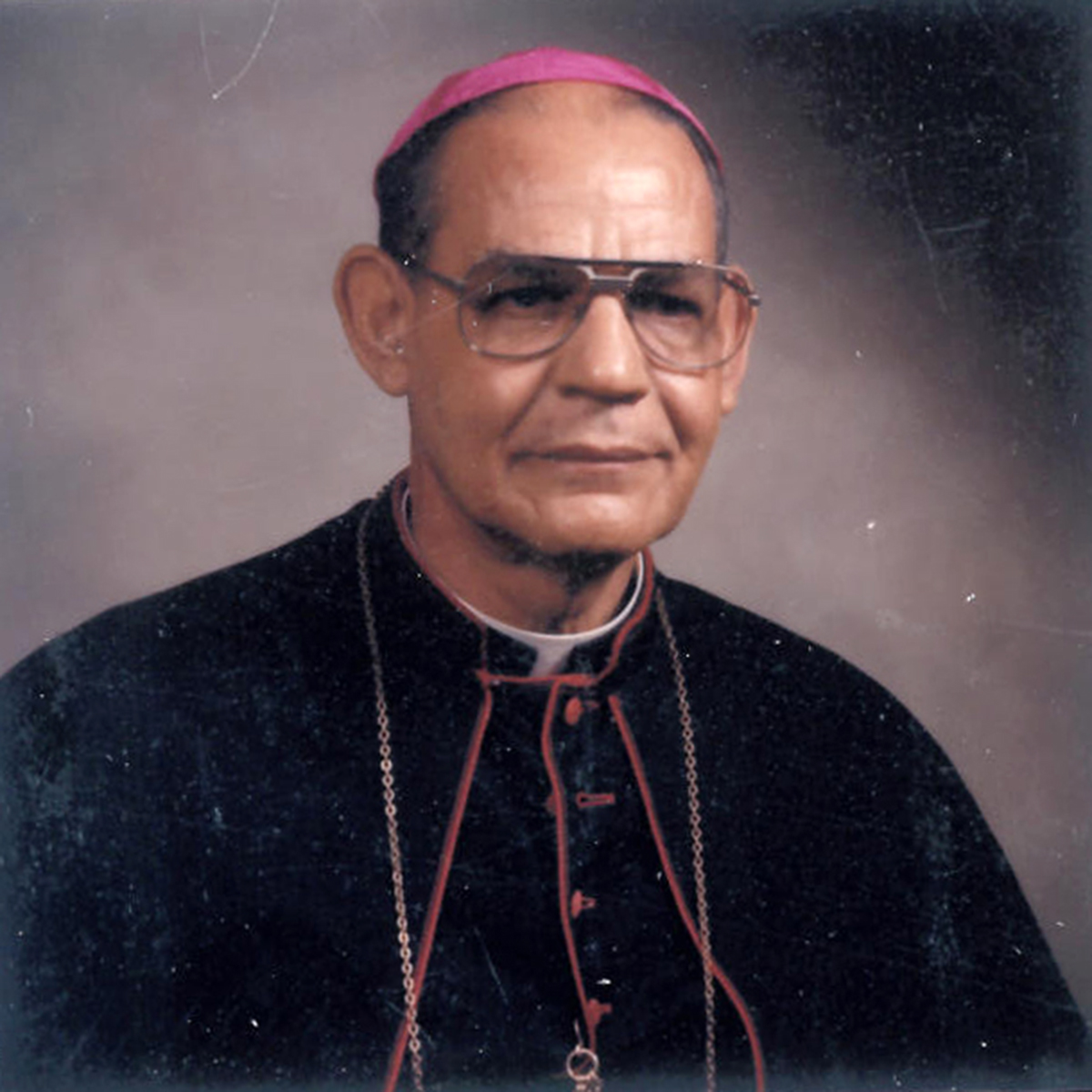
- Church: Catholic Church
- Archdiocese: Archdiocese of Santiago de los Caballeros
- In office: 13 July 1992 – 16 July 2003
- Predecessor: Roque Antonio Adames Rodríguez
- Successor: Ramón Benito de la Rosa y Carpio
- Previous post: Bishop of La Vega (1966-1992)

Orders
- Ordination: 12 July 1953
- Consecration: 12 June 1966 by Hugo Eduardo Polanco Brito

Personal details
- Born: 3 July 1927 Boca de Licey, Tamboril, Santiago Province, Dominican Republic
- Died: 9 November 2014 (aged 87)

Juan Antonio Flores Santana (3 July 1927 – 9 November 2014) was a Roman Catholic archbishop.

Ordained to the priesthood on 12 July 1952, Flores Santana was named bishop of the Roman Catholic Diocese of La Vega, Dominican Republic, on 24 April 1966, and was ordained bishop on 12 June 1966. On 13 June 1992, he was appointed bishop of the Roman Catholic Diocese of Santiago de los Caballeros and then archbishop of the same diocese on 14 February 1994, from which he retired on 16 July 2003.
