= Evangelical Church of the Dominican Republic =

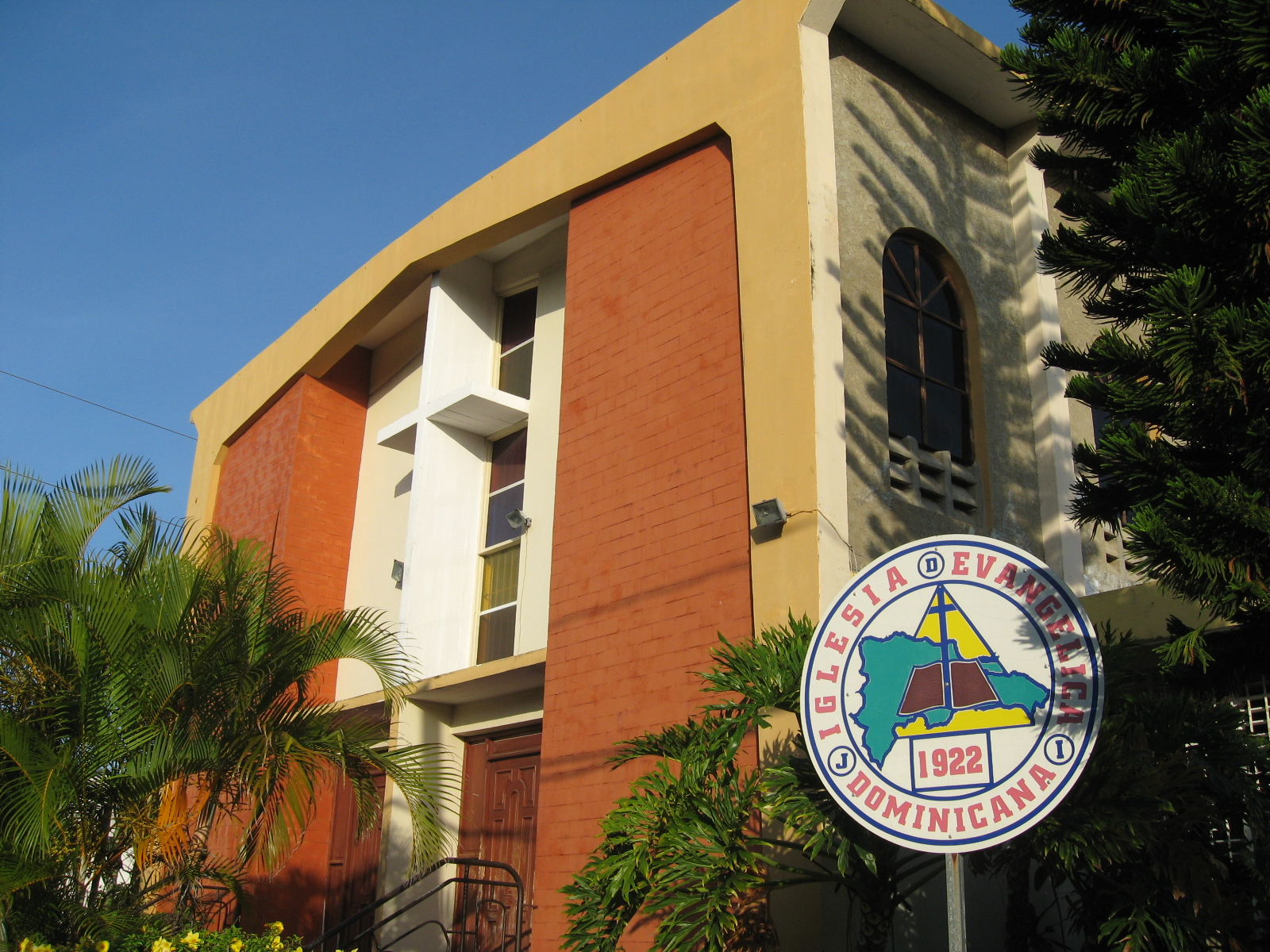
Dominican Evangelical Church in Puerto Plata

Evangelical church in Santo Domingo

The Evangelical Church of the Dominican Republic (Iglesia Evangélica Dominicana) is one of the largest Protestant denominations in the Dominican Republic with approximately 10,000 members in 55 congregations.

== History ==
British missionaries and American Methodists travelled to the Dominican Republic in the 1880s.

The Evangelical Church of the Dominican Republic was founded in 1922 as an ecumenical project by three denominations from the United States: the Methodist Episcopal Church, the United Brethren (both now the United Methodist Church), and the Presbyterian Church (USA). Previously in 1919 these three denominations created the Alliance for Christian Service in Santo Domingo. Later with 29 members the Evangelical Church was founded, and the work spread rapidly. In 1960 the church united with the Wesleyan Methodists, and in 1960 with the Moravians. By the time of the World War II it had more than 1,000 members. Today it is the second largest Protestant church in the country.

In 1978, the Evangelical Church of the Dominican Republic, together with Dominican Episcopal Church founded the Center for Theological Studies of Santo Domingo, a Protestant seminary.

== Memberships ==
The Evangelical Church of the Dominican Republic is a member of the World Communion of Reformed Churches, World Methodist Council and the Latin American Council of Churches (Consejo Latinoamericano de Iglesias).

== See also ==
- Religion in the Dominican Republic
- Protestantism in the Dominican Republic
- Catholic Church in the Dominican Republic
- Afro-American religion
- Religion in Latin America
