= Bartolomé Torres =

Bartolomé Torres may refer to:

- Bartolomé de Torres Naharro (c. 1485–c. 1530), Spanish dramatist and Leonese-language writer
- Bartolomé Torres (bishop) (1512–1568), Roman Catholic prelate
