= Manuel Antonio Ruíz de la Rosa =

Dominican Republic Catholic bishop

The Most Reverend Mons. Manuel Antonio Ruíz de la Rosa
- Bishop of Stella Maris
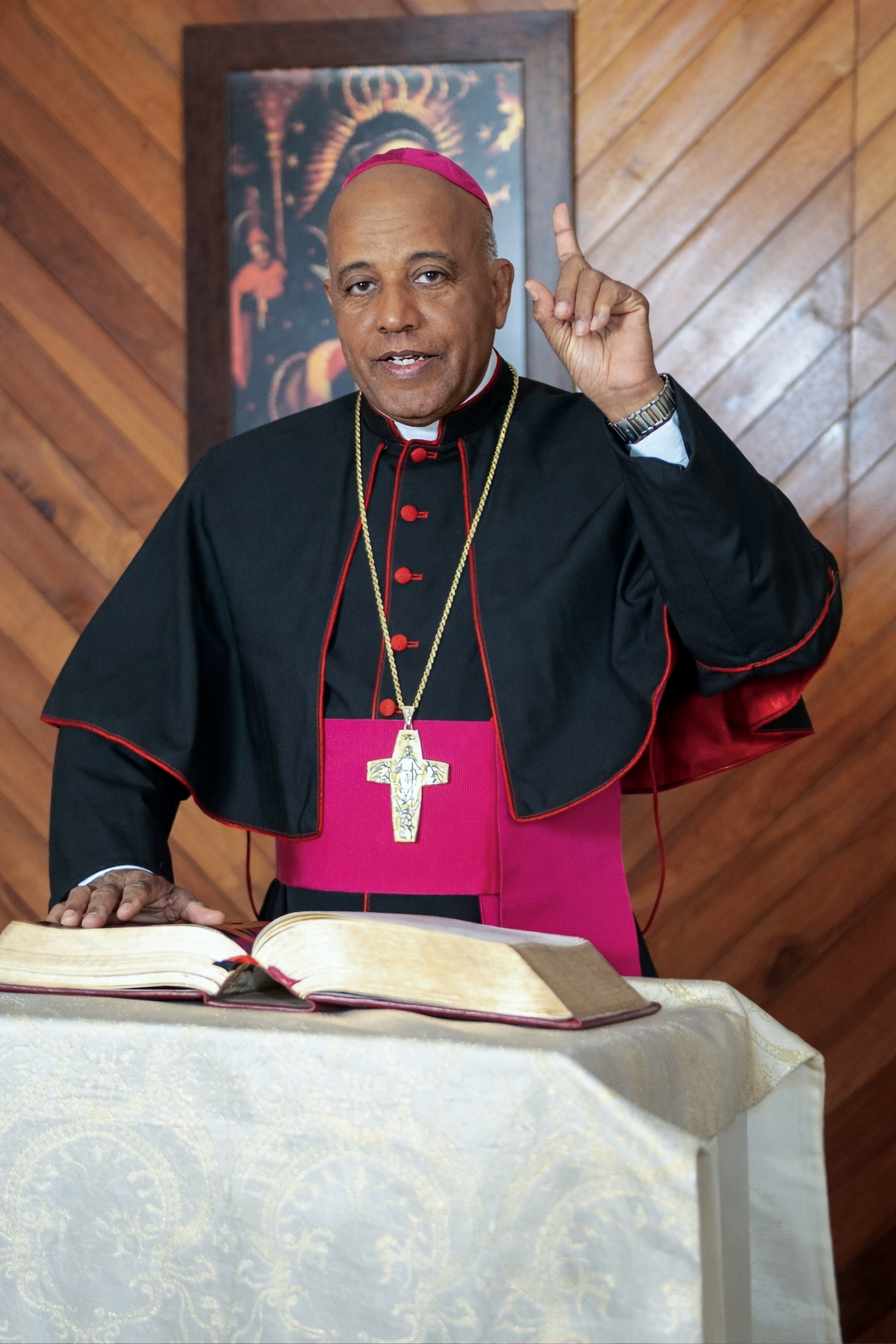
- Diocese: Stella Maris
- Appointed: 27 August 2025

Orders
- Ordination: 10 July 1993 by Nicolás de Jesús López Rodríguez
- Consecration: 8 November 2025 by Piergiorgio Bertoldi, Fausto Ramón Mejía Vallejo, and Freddy Antonio de Jesús Bretón Martínez

Personal details
- Born: 27 August 1965 (age 60) Bayaguana, Monte Plata, Dominican Republic
- Motto: In Nomine Tuo, Domine

Styles of Manuel Antonio Ruíz de la Rosa
- Reference style: His Excellency; The Most Reverend; Mons.
- Spoken style: Your Excellency
- Religious style: Bishop

Manuel Antonio Ruíz de la Rosa, commonly referred to as Manuel Ruíz, (born 27 August 1965) is a Roman Catholic bishop from the Dominican Republic with a history of involvement in social initiatives. As of 2025, Ruíz serves as the first bishop of the Diocese of Stella Maris.

== Early life and education ==
Ruíz was born 27 August 1965 in Bayaguana, a municipality in the Dominican Republic's Monte Plata Province. He is one of 17 siblings.

Ruíz studied philosophy at Pontificia Universidad Católica Madre y Maestra (PUCMM) before completing studies in theology at Pontifical Seminary of Saint Thomas Aquinas (SPSTA). He also possesses a humanities doctorate from the University of Seville in Spain. He has taught as a professor at both PUCMM and the Universidad Católica Santo Domingo, and he served as a formator at SPSTA.

== Priesthood ==
After completing seminary, Ruíz was ordained a priest on 10 July 1993 by Cardinal Nicolás de Jesús López Rodríguez. He was incardinated as a priest for the Archdiocese of Santo Domingo. As a parish priest, Ruíz was known for his leadership, dedicated work, and sensitivity. He has been especially dedicated to areas of education, communication, ecology, and healthcare.

=== Social initiatives ===
Ruíz has received attention for many public projects, especially in Santo Domingo Este's poorer neighborhoods, such as El Dique.

He founded Movearte Colegio, a school built largely of recycled materials rescued from the Ozama River. Ruíz oversees a hospital boat, "the ark of mercy," which runs on the Ozama and is serviced by a separate ambulance boat. Inspired by the Movearte project, he helped establish a system for using recycled materials in home construction. Ruíz established a Bible park, which incorporates biblical narratives in a natural area. For these various ecological and social initiatives for the poor, he was called a "son of [Pope] Francis."

Ruíz was the co-founder of Radio Maria in the Dominican Republic. Before his appointment as bishop, he served as the director of the "Hogar Vida y Esperanza" project for orphaned and disabled youth.

=== Episcopal conference roles ===
As a priest, he served as executive secretary and other roles for the Episcopal Conference of the Dominican Republic (CED). As executive secretary, Ruíz became the CED's spokesman during the 2013 sexual abuse allegations against former apostolic nuncio Józef Wesołowski and another Polish priest. During interviews, Ruíz brushed off questions about why Pope Francis had removed Wesołowski.

In 2014, he resigned from his position as CED governmental liaison following Danilo Medina's veto of a full abortion ban. While still the conference representative, Ruíz led a public protest in front of Congress. Immediately before resigning, Ruíz issued a note accusing Medina and Leonel Fernández of compromising values for the sake of reelection. Ruíz later clarified that his values were at odds with Medina's decision, so he could not continue as church-state liaison in good faith.

==== 2016 Wally Brewster protest ====
Ruíz became the subject of criticism in 2016. As a school chaplain of San Juan Bautista de la Salle in Santo Domingo, he placed signs banning U.S. Ambassador Wally Brewster from school property and describing Brewster's presence as "inappropriate." Brewster faced backlash from both Catholic and Evangelical leaders throughout his diplomatic tenure in the Dominican Republic due to Brewster's same-sex marriage and alleged governmental interference.

==== Handling of Wesołowski abuse allegations ====
Ruíz's 2016 protest against Ambassador Brewster reawakened criticism for the church's handling of sexual abuse allegations against nuncio Józef Wesołowski three years prior. Ruíz was the CED spokesman regarding Wesołowski's sudden removal in 2013, and Ruíz did not elaborate what sort of investigations were underway. Before Wesołowski was found guilty in ecclesial court and laicized in 2014 as a result of the investigations, Ruíz accused five journalists of defamation and slander against Wesołowski in Dominican civil court. Dominican courts later threw out these allegations.

== Episcopacy ==
On 27 August 2025, Pope Leo XIV erected the Diocese of Stella Maris and appointed Ruíz to be its first bishop. Stella Maris is only the second diocese created by Pope Leo XIV.

Early in October 2025, Bishop-Elect Ruíz visited Rome. During that visit, Ruíz met Leo at an audience and invited the pope to visit the Dominican Republic.

He was consecrated a bishop by Piergiorgio Bertoldi, papal nuncio to the Dominican Republic, on 8 November 2025. The altar used during the ceremony was shaped like a boat. Ruíz's episcopal ordination was attended by both ecclesial and civil Dominican leader, including President Luis Abinader, former President Leonel Fernández, and Cardinal Nicolás de Jesús López Rodríguez. Also in attendance were bishops from Haiti, the mainland United States, and Puerto Rico.
