= Catholic Church in the Dominican Republic =

Catholic Church in Dominican Republic
- Iglesia Católica en República Dominicana
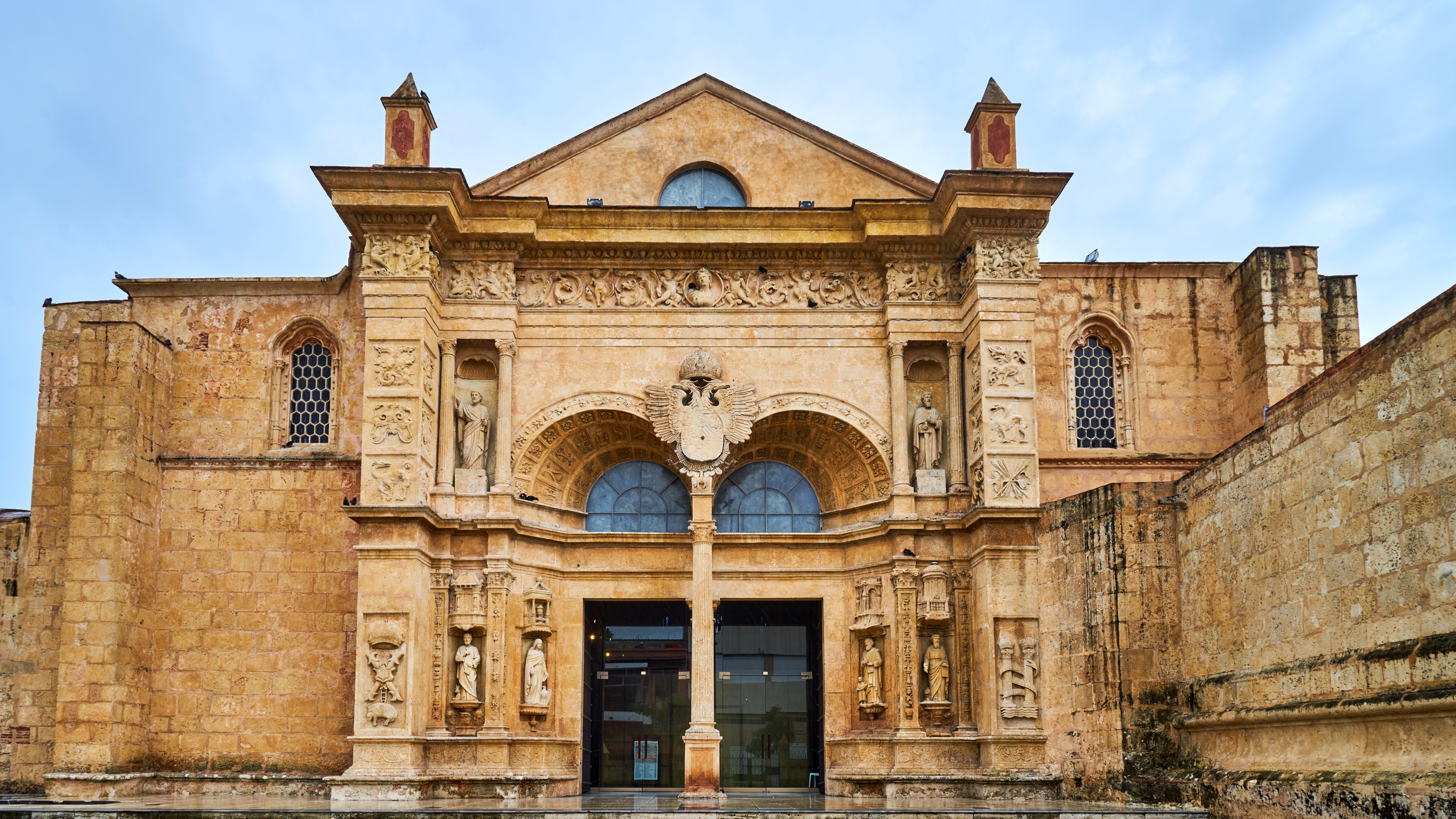
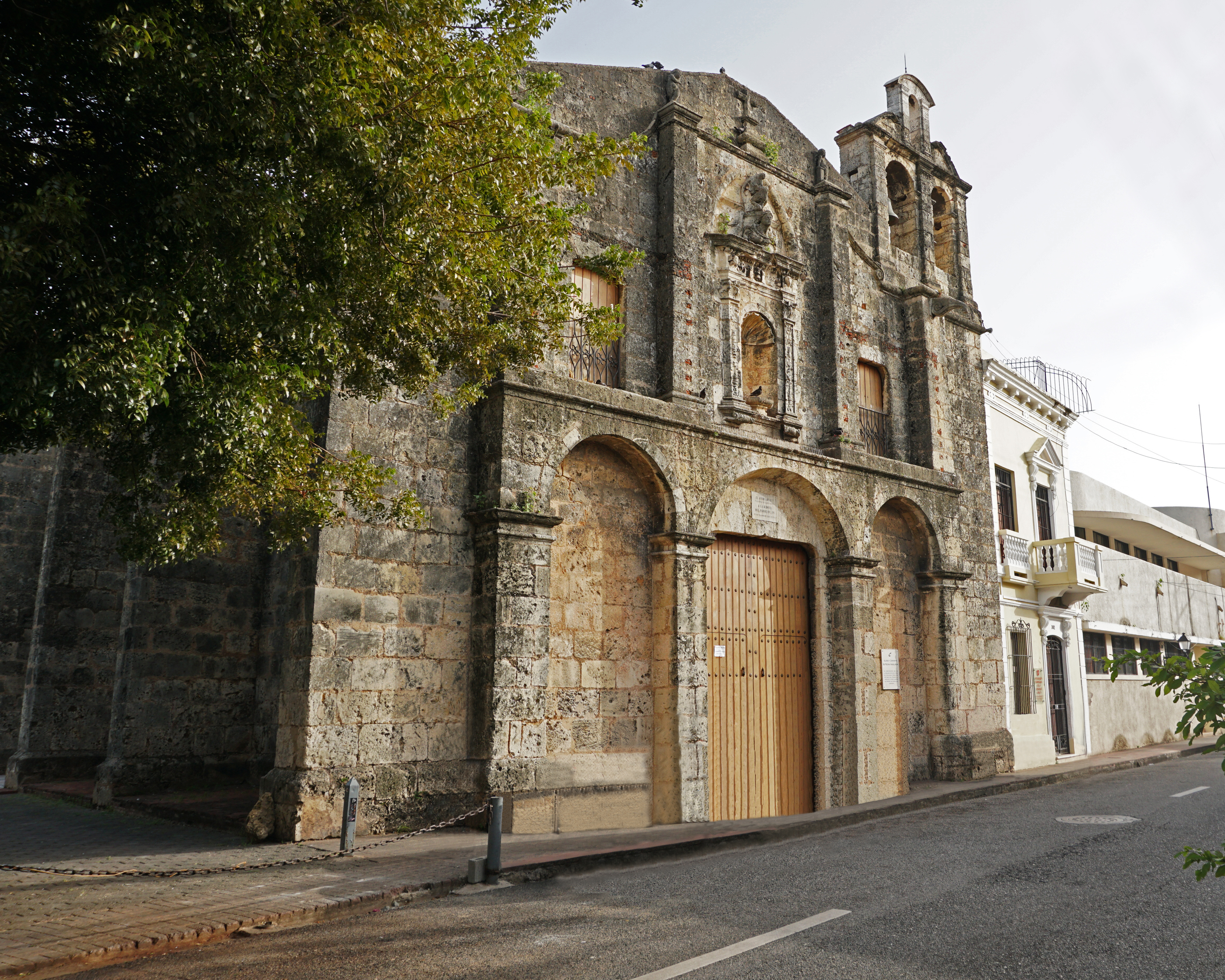
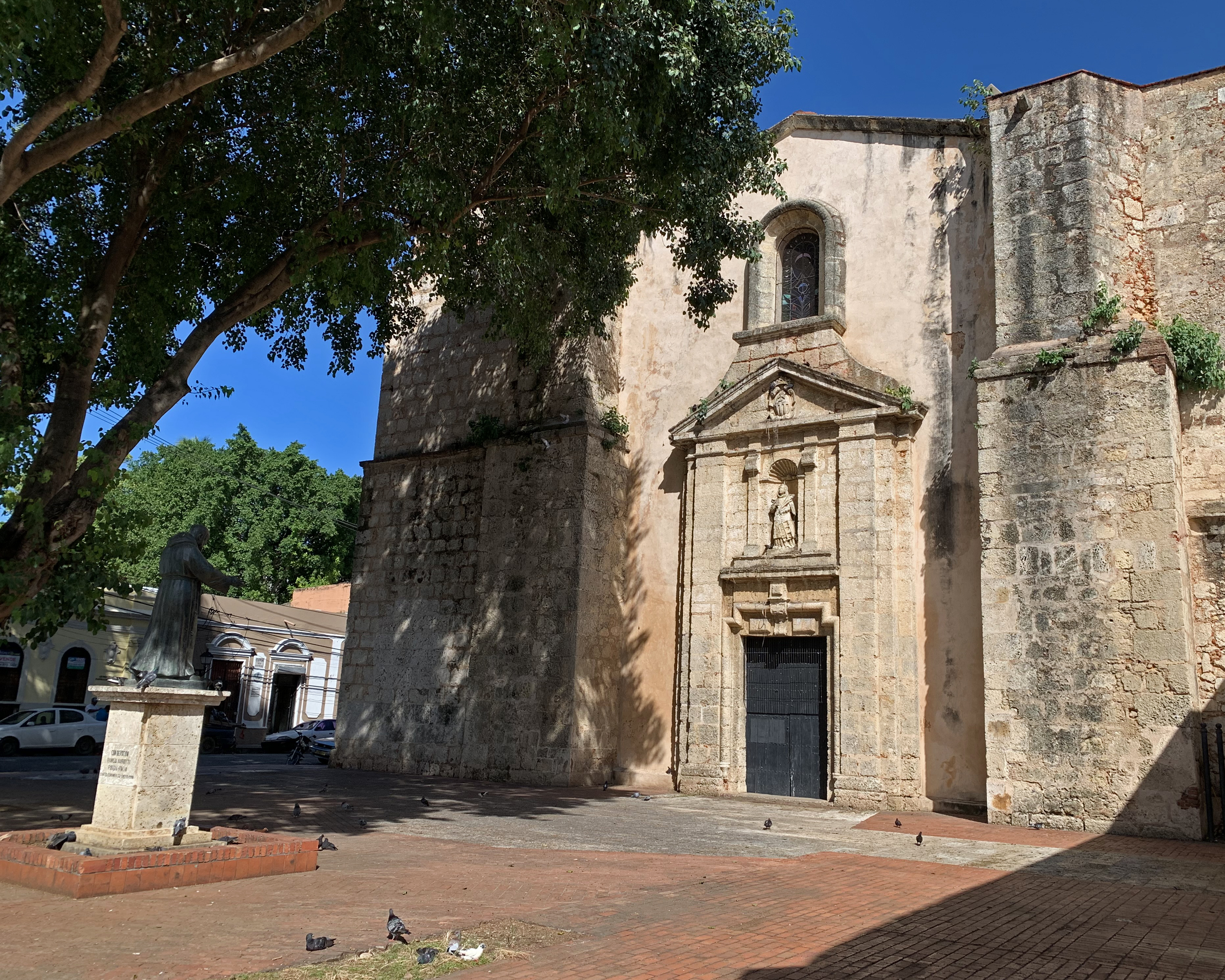
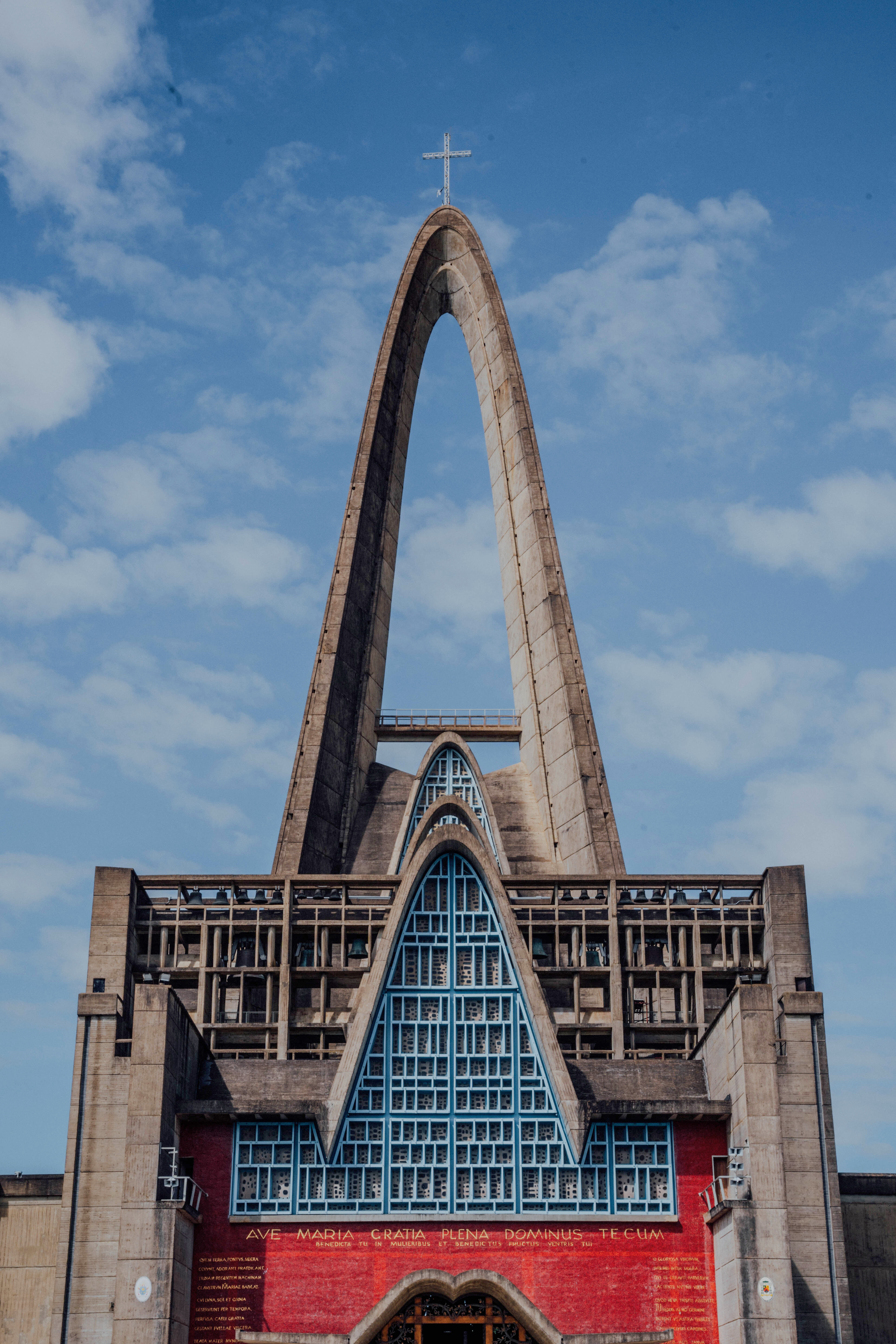
- Classification: Catholic
- Orientation: Latin
- Scripture: Bible
- Polity: Episcopal
- Governance: Episcopal Conference of the Dominican Republic
- Pope: Leo XIV
- President: Héctor Rafael Rodríguez Rodríguez
- Language: Spanish, Latin
- Headquarters: Santo Domingo
- Origin: 1494
- Members: 6 million (2020)
- Official website: Episcopal Conference of the Dominican Republic

The Catholic Church in the Dominican Republic is part of the worldwide Catholic Church, under the spiritual leadership of the Pope in Rome.

The Catholic Church is the world's largest Christian Church, and its largest religious grouping. There are an estimated 5 million Catholics in the Dominican Republic (48% of the population). In 2020, just over 50% of Dominicans identified as Catholic, served by 1,140 priests across 709 parishes.

== Hierarchy ==
Within the Dominican Republic the hierarchy consists of:

- Archbishopric
  - Bishopric
- Archdiocese of Santiago de los Caballeros
  - Diocese of La Vega
  - Diocese of Mao-Monte Cristi
  - Diocese of Puerto Plata
  - Diocese of San Francisco de Macorís
- Archdiocese of Santo Domingo
  - Diocese of Baní
  - Diocese of Barahona
  - Diocese of Nuestra Señora de la Altagracia in Higüey
  - Diocese of San Juan de la Maguana
  - Diocese of San Pedro de Macorís
  - Diocese of Stella Maris
- Military Ordinariate of the Dominican Republic

== Church in society ==
The Dominican Republic offers religious freedom, and Catholicism is the official religion of the state; this was signed into law by the 1954 concordat with the Vatican. Under Rafael Trujillo's government, the power of the Catholic Church was limited.

== Gallery ==
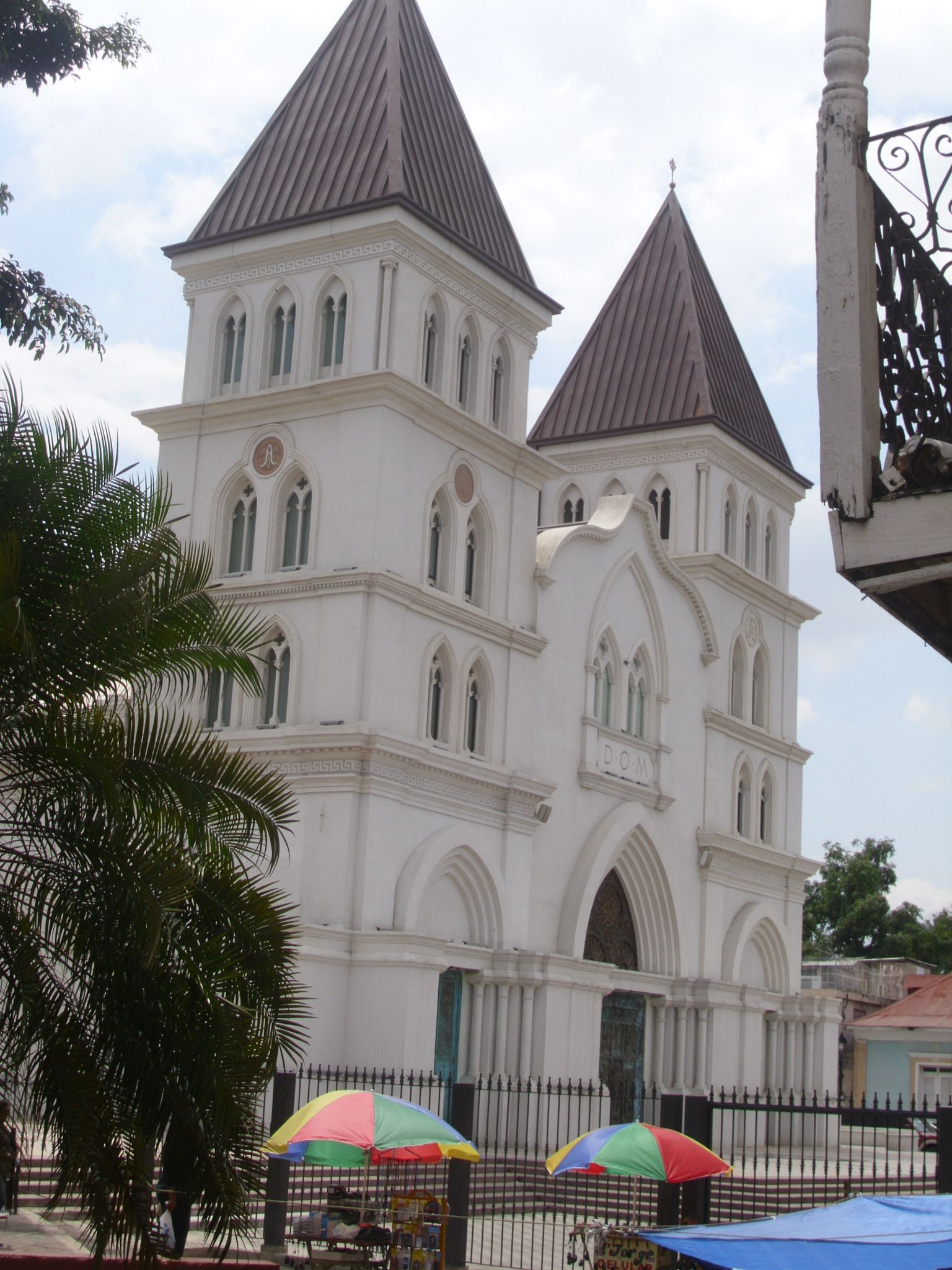

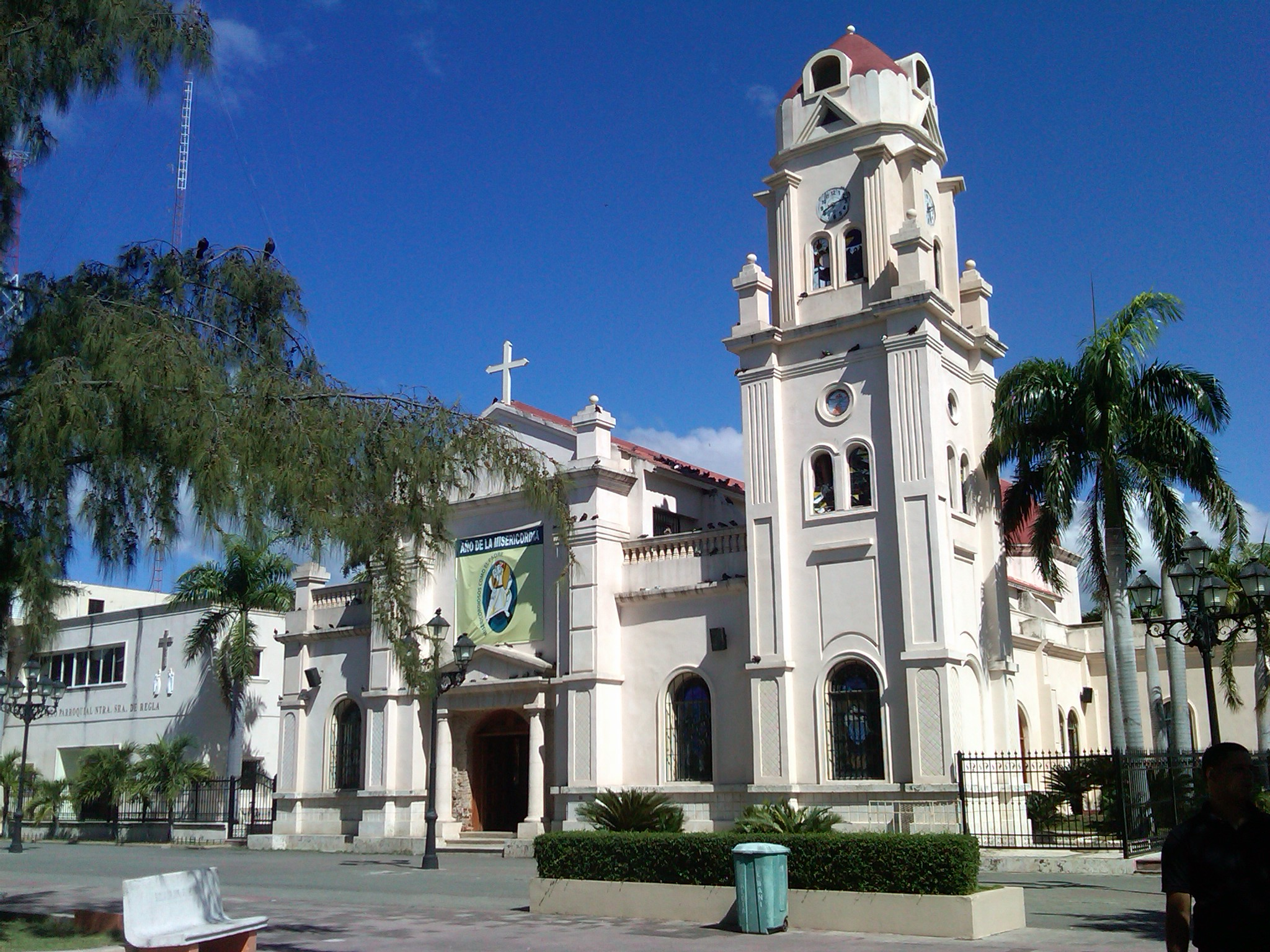

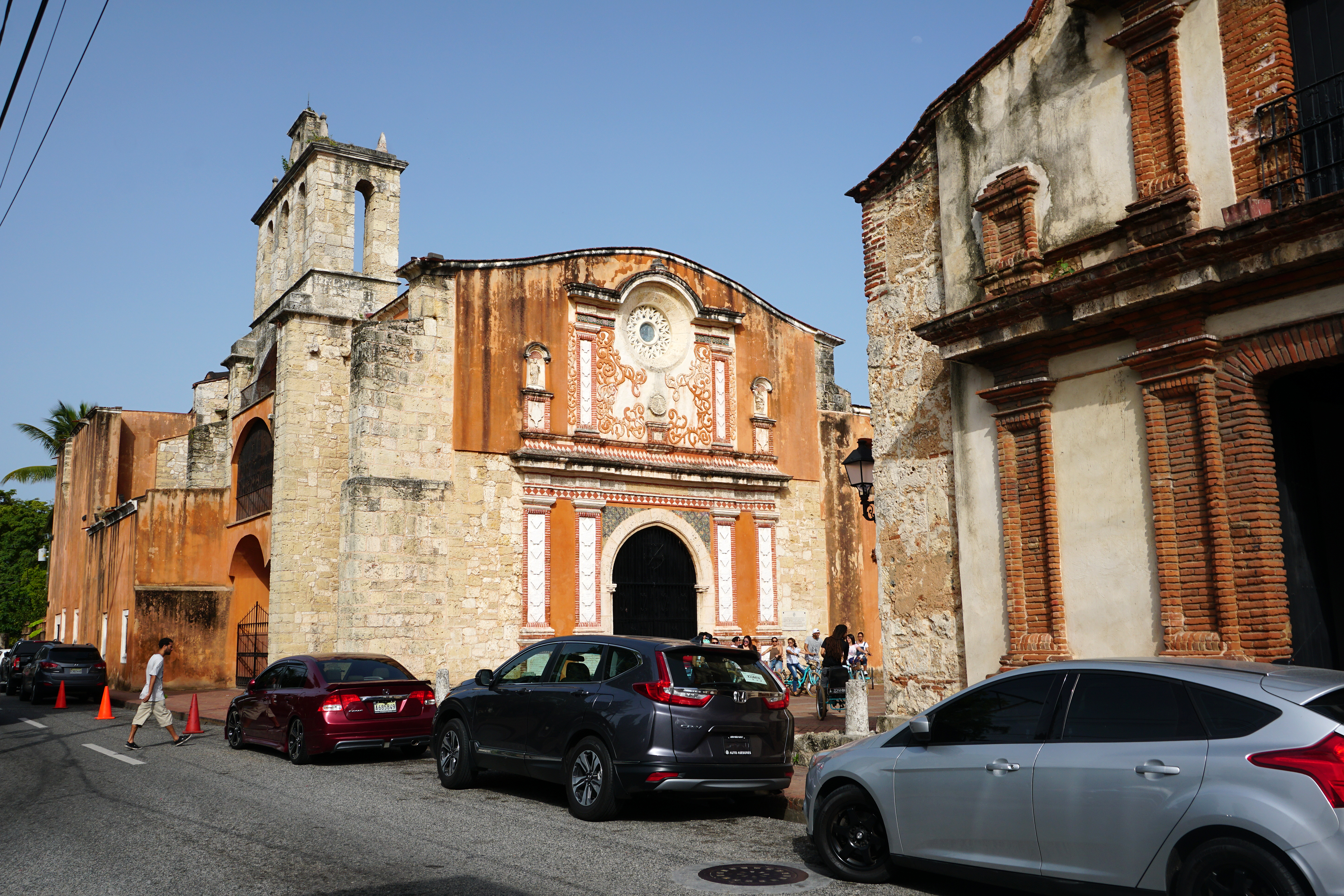

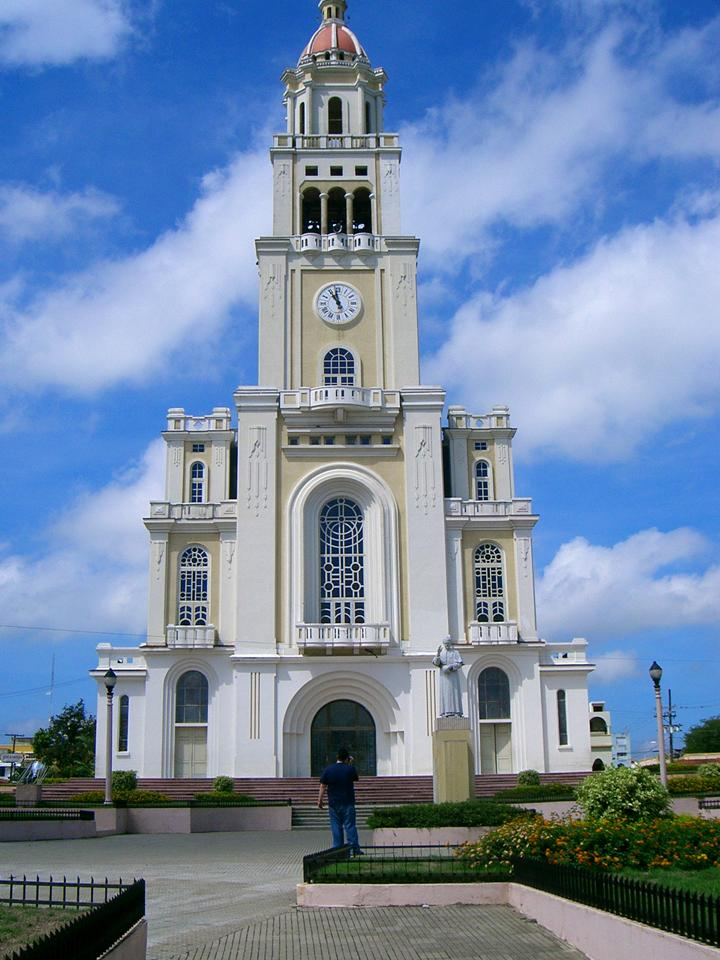

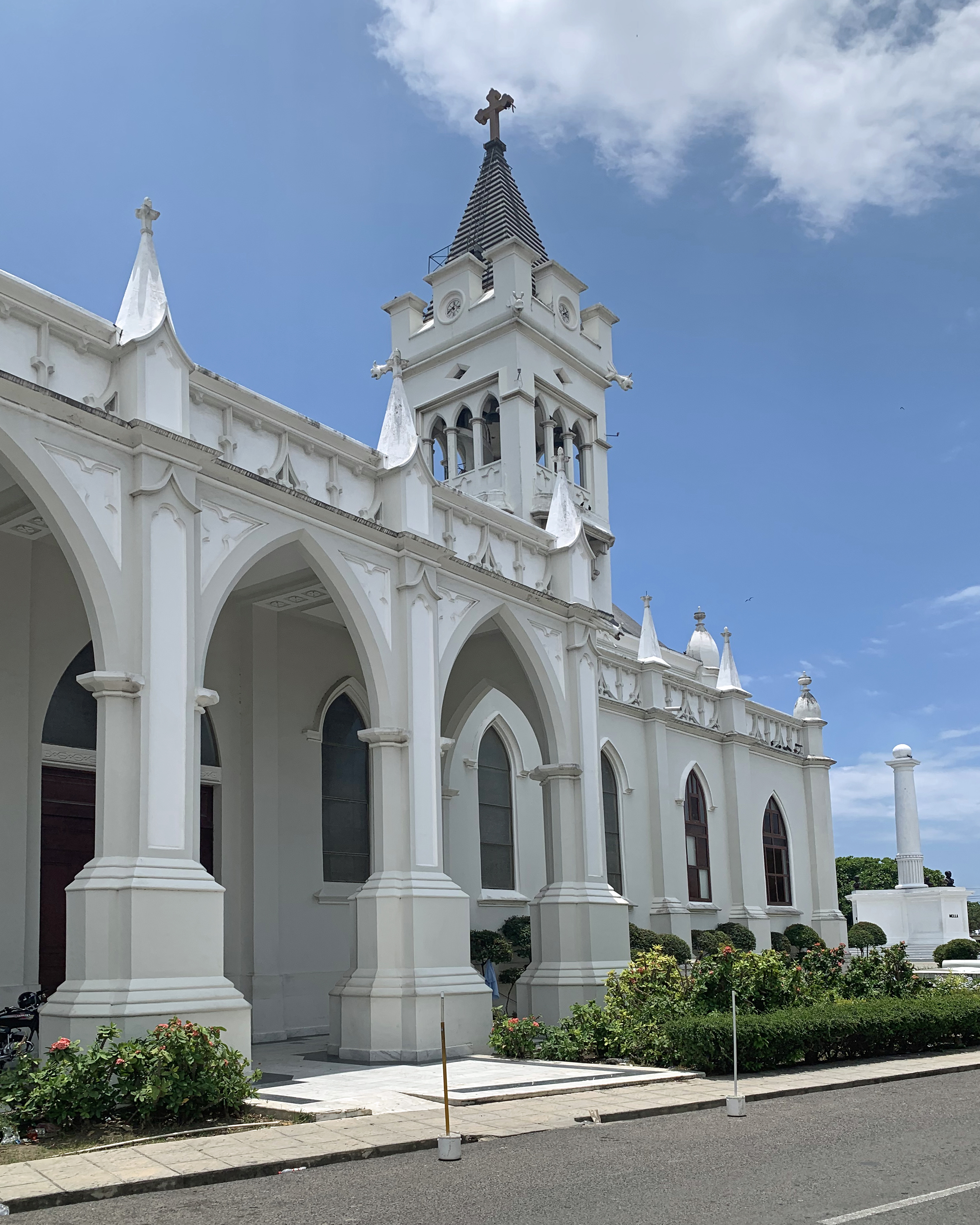

== See also ==
- Religion in the Dominican Republic
- Protestantism in the Dominican Republic
- Religion in Latin America
- List of Central American and Caribbean Saints

== References and notes ==
- International Religious Freedom Report 2022 Dominican Republic, U.S. Department of State, 2022 report
