= Juan Salcedo =

Juan Salcedo may refer to:

- Juan Salcedo (bishop) (1520 - 1562), Roman Catholic Archbishop of Santo Domingo
- Juan de Salcedo (1549 – 1576), Spanish conquistador
- Juan Salcedo, Jr., former Secretary of the Department of Health in the Philippines
