= Juan Alonso de Solis y Mendoza =

Most Reverend Juan Alonso de Solis y Mendoza
- Bishop of Puerto Rico
- Church: Catholic Church
- Diocese: Diocese of Puerto Rico
- In office: 1635–1641
- Predecessor: Juan López de Agurto de la Mata
- Successor: Damián Lopez de Haro y Villarda

Orders
- Consecration: August 1637 by Facundo de la Torre

Personal details
- Born: June 13, 1574 Salamanca, Spain
- Died: April 19, 1641 (age 66) Santo Domingo

Juan Alonso de Solis y Mendoza (June 13, 1574 – April 19, 1641) was a Roman Catholic prelate who served as Bishop of Puerto Rico (1635–1641).

== Biography ==
Juan Alonso de Solis y Mendoza was born in Salamanca, Spain on June 13, 1574, and ordained a priest in the Order of Carmelites. On January 11, 1635, he was appointed by the King of Spain and confirmed on September 1, 1636, by Pope Urban VIII as Bishop of Puerto Rico. In August 1637, he was consecrated bishop by Facundo de la Torre, Archbishop of Santo Domingo. He served as Bishop of Puerto Rico until his death on April 19, 1641.

== External links and additional sources ==
- Cheney, David M. "Archdiocese of San Juan de Puerto Rico". Catholic-Hierarchy.org. (for Chronology of Bishops) ^{[self-published]}
- Chow, Gabriel. "Metropolitan Archdiocese of San Juan de Puerto Rico". GCatholic.org. (for Chronology of Bishops) ^{[self-published]}

Religious titles
Preceded by Juan López de Agurto de la Mata	Bishop of Puerto Rico; 1635–1641	Succeeded by Damián Lopez de Haro y Villarda
