= Príamo Tejeda =

Dominican Roman Catholic prelate (1934–2024)

Most Reverend Príamo Tejeda
- Bishop Emeritus of Baní
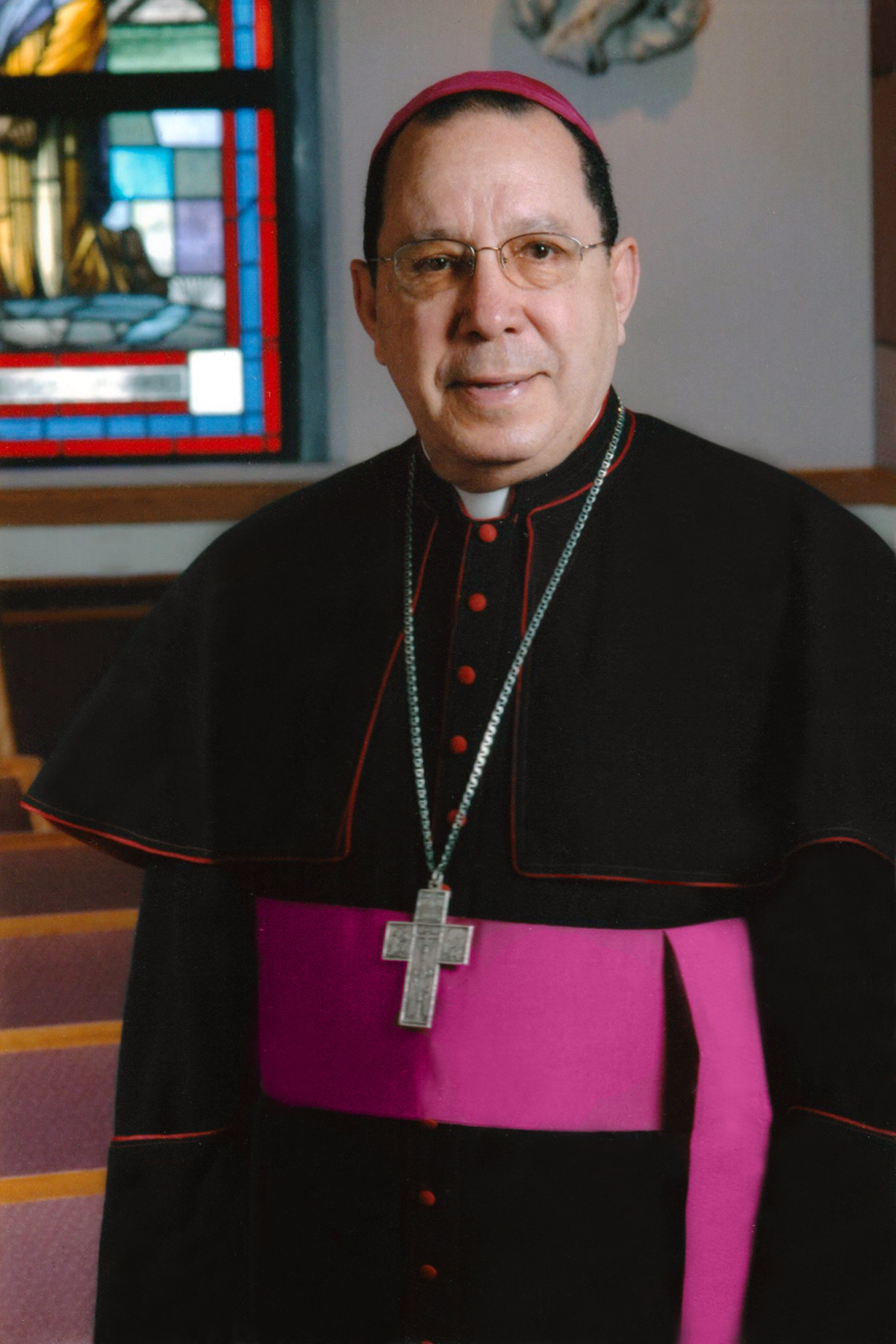
- Tejeda, c. 2007
- Church: Roman Catholic Church
- Metropolis: Roman Catholic Archdiocese of Santo Domingo
- Diocese: Roman Catholic Diocese of Baní
- Installed: 8 November 1986
- Term ended: 13 December 1997
- Predecessor: First
- Successor: Freddy Antonio de Jesús Bretón Martínez
- Previous posts: Auxiliary Bishop of Santo Domingo and Titular Bishop of Gilba (1975–1986)

Orders
- Ordination: 11 May 1966 by Octavio Antonio Beras Rojas
- Consecration: 13 July 1975 by Octavio Antonio Beras Rojas

Personal details
- Born: Príamo Pericles Tejeda Rosario; 20 April 1934 Santo Domingo, Dominican Republic
- Died: 17 May 2024 (aged 90) Santo Domingo, Dominican Republic
- Denomination: Roman Catholic
- Motto: FE Y OBEDIENCIA
- Coat of arms

Styles of Príamo Pericles Tejeda Rosario
- Reference style: His Excellency; The Most Reverend
- Spoken style: Your Excellency
- Religious style: Bishop

Príamo Pericles Tejeda Rosario (20 April 1934 – 17 May 2024) was a Dominican Roman Catholic prelate. He was auxiliary bishop of Santo Domingo and titular of Gilba from 1975 to 1986 and first bishop of Baní from 1986 to 1997.

In his pastoral government, he founded the Monastery of the Discalced Carmelites of Baní, the Diocesan Brothers of Evangelization and the Dr. Rafael A. Miranda Mother and Child Center, in front of the Luis E. Aybar hospital in the city of Santo Domingo. In 2007 he was accused of sexual abuse by a 42-year-old Cuban man.

Tejeda died in Santo Domingo on 17 May 2024, at the age of 90.

Catholic Church titles
Preceded by First	Bishop of Baní; 1986–1997	Succeeded by Freddy Antonio de Jesús Bretón Martínez
Preceded by Honoré Van Waeyenbergh	Titular Bishop of Gilba; 1975–1986	Succeeded by Joseph Lafontant
