= Priamo =

Priamo is a surname and given name. Notable eople with that name include:

== Surname ==
- Andrea De Priamo (born 1971), Italian politician
- Matteo Priamo (born/ 1982), Italian cyclist

== Given name ==
- Priamo della Quercia (c. 1400 – 1467), Italian painter and miniaturist
- Priamo Leonardi (1888-1984), Italian admiral
- Príamo Tejeda (1934-2024), Roman Catholic prelate from the Dominican Republic
