= Protestantism in the Dominican Republic =

Protestants in the Dominican Republic represent a sizeable minority of the population.

== Background ==
There are several figures for the number of Protestants in the country. In 2017, statistics estimated that 20% of the population was Protestant, with 75% Catholic, 3% no religion, and 2% other religions.

The 2020 Latinobarometer survey noted that 20% of the population were evangelical Protestant, with a sizeable number of non-evangelical Protestants. The World Religion Database noted that in 2025 Protestants comprised 6.77% of the population.

Morgan Foley was the leader of the Protestantism for women in the 19th century. During the 1820s, Protestants migrated to the Dominican Republic from the United States. West Indian Protestants arrived on the island late 19th and the early 20th centuries, and by the 1920s, several Protestant organizations were established all throughout the country, which added diversity to the religious representation in the Dominican Republic. Many of the Protestant groups in DR had connections with organizations in the United States including Evangelical groups like the Assemblies of God, the Evangelical Church of the Dominican Republic (a united Methodist-Presbyterian church), and the Seventh-day Adventist Church. These groups dominated the Protestant movement in the earlier part of the 20th century, but in the 1960s and 1970s Pentecostal churches saw the most growth.

Protestant denominations active in the Dominican Republic include:

- Assembly of God
- Church of God
- Baptist
- Pentecostal
- Seventh-day Adventist Church

Missionaries, Episcopalians, Jehovah's Witnesses, Mormons, and Mennonites, also travel to the island. Jehovah's Witnesses, specifically, have been known to be migrating (more so during the last decade) to the Dominican Republic, where they feel there is a "great need" for evangelizing their faith. However they are not seen as Protestant denomination by mainstream Christianity.

== See also ==
- Religion in the Dominican Republic
- Evangelical Church of the Dominican Republic
- Catholic Church in the Dominican Republic
- Afro-American religion
- Religion in Latin America
