= Pablo Cedano Cedano =

Dominican Republic Roman Catholic bishop (1936–2018)

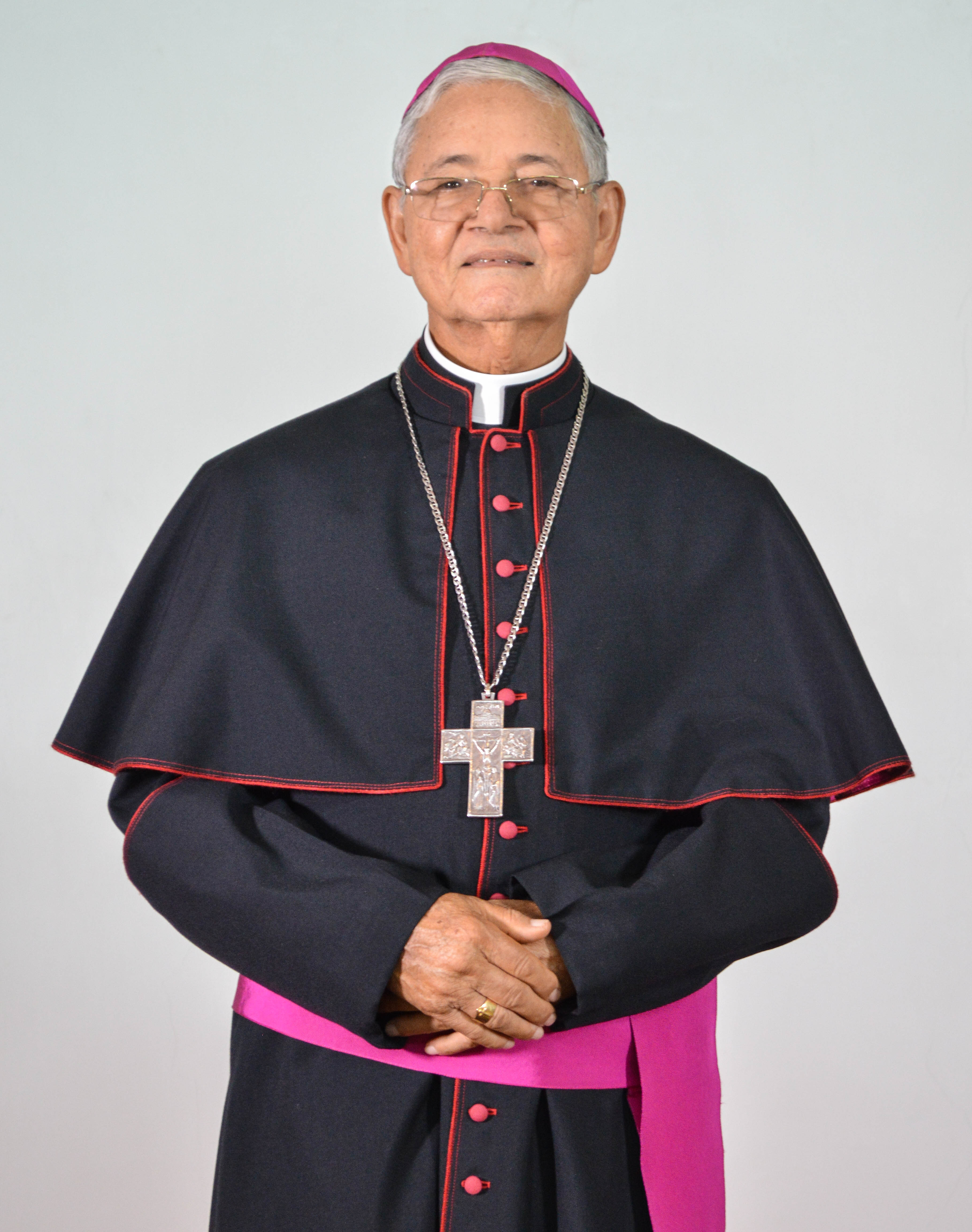

Pablo Cedano Cedano (25 January 1936 – 19 November 2018) was a Dominican Republic Roman Catholic bishop.

== Biography ==
Cedano Cedano was born on 25 January 1936, in the Dominican Republic, and was ordained to the priesthood in 1967. He served as titular bishop of Vita and as auxiliary bishop of the Roman Catholic Archdiocese of Santo Domingo, Dominican Republic, from 1996 until 2013. He died on 19 November 2018, aged 82.
