= Facundo de la Torre =

Spanish Catholic prelate

Most Reverend Facundo de la Torre
- Archbishop of Santo Domingo
- Church: Catholic Church
- Archdiocese: Archdiocese of Santo Domingo
- In office: 1631–1640
- Predecessor: Bernardino de Almansa Carrión
- Successor: Diego de Guevara y Estrada

Orders
- Consecration: September 1632 by Fernando Valdés Llano

Personal details
- Born: 1570 Sahagún, Spain
- Died: September 25, 1640 (aged 69–70) Santo Domingo

Facundo de la Torre (also Fernando de la Torre; 1570 – September 25, 1640) was a Catholic prelate who served as the Archbishop of Santo Domingo (1631–1640).

== Biography ==
Facundo de la Torre was born in Sahagún, Spain and ordained a priest in the Order of Saint Benedict. On July 17, 1631, he was appointed by the King of Spain and confirmed by Urban VIII on January 2, 1632, as Archbishop of Santo Domingo. In September 1632, he was consecrated bishop by Fernando Valdés Llano, Bishop of Teruel with Francisco Olivares Maldonado, Auxiliary Bishop of Toledo, and Timoteo Pérez Vargas, Archbishop Emeritus of Baghdad as co-consecrators. He served as Archbishop of Santo Domingo until his death on September 25, 1640. While bishop, he was the principal consecrator of Juan Alonso de Solis y Mendoza, Bishop of Puerto Rico.

== External links and additional sources ==
- Cheney, David M. "Archdiocese of Santo Domingo". Catholic-Hierarchy.org. (for Chronology of Bishops) ^{[self-published]}
- Chow, Gabriel. "Metropolitan Archdiocese of Santo Domingo". GCatholic.org. (for Chronology of Bishops) ^{[self-published]}

Catholic Church titles
Preceded by Bernardino de Almansa Carrión	Archbishop of Santo Domingo; 1631–1640	Succeeded by Diego de Guevara y Estrada
