= Maestro Valderas =

Most Reverend Maestro Valderas
- Archbishop of Santo Domingo
- Church: Catholic Church
- Archdiocese: Archdiocese of Santo Domingo
- In office: 1647–1648
- Predecessor: Diego de Guevara y Estrada
- Successor: Francisco Pio Guadalupe Téllez

Maestro Valderas was a Roman Catholic prelate who served as the Archbishop of Santo Domingo (1647–1648).

== Biography ==
Maestro Valderas was ordained a friar in the Order of the Blessed Virgin Mary of Mercy. In 1647, he was selected by the King of Spain and confirmed by Pope Innocent X as Archbishop of Santo Domingo. He served as Archbishop of Santo Domingo until his resignation in 1648.

== External links and additional sources ==
- Cheney, David M. "Archdiocese of Santo Domingo". Catholic-Hierarchy.org. (for Chronology of Bishops) ^{[self-published]}
- Chow, Gabriel. "Metropolitan Archdiocese of Santo Domingo". GCatholic.org. (for Chronology of Bishops) ^{[self-published]}

Religious titles
Preceded by Diego de Guevara y Estrada	Archbishop of Santo Domingo; 1647–1648	Succeeded by Francisco Pio Guadalupe Téllez
