= Juan López de Agurto de la Mata =

Most Reverend Juan López de Agurto de la Mata
- Bishop of Caracas
- Church: Catholic Church
- Diocese: Diocese of Caracas
- In office: 1634–1637
- Predecessor: Bernardo de Balbuena y Villanueva
- Successor: Juan Alonso de Solis y Mendoza
- Previous post: Bishop of Puerto Rico (1630–1634)

Personal details
- Born: December 22, 1572 San Cristóbal de La Laguna, Spain
- Died: December 24, 1637 (age 65)

Juan López de Agurto de la Mata (December 22, 1572 – December 24, 1637) was a Catholic prelate who served as Bishop of Coro (later Bishop of Caracas) (1634–1637) and Bishop of Puerto Rico (1630–1634).

== Biography ==
Juan López de Agurto de la Mata was born in San Cristóbal de La Laguna (Tenerife, Spain). On July 20, 1630, he was appointed by the King of Spain and confirmed on February 10, 1631, by Pope Urban VIII as Bishop of Puerto Rico. On August 8, 1634, he was appointed by the King of Spain and confirmed by Pope Urban VIII as Bishop of Coro. On June 20, 1637, the Diocese of Coro was renamed as the Diocese of Caracas, Santiago de Venezuela. He served as Bishop of Caracas until his death on December 24, 1637.

== External links and additional sources ==
- Cheney, David M. "Archdiocese of San Juan de Puerto Rico". Catholic-Hierarchy.org. (for Chronology of Bishops) ^{[self-published]}
- Chow, Gabriel. "Metropolitan Archdiocese of San Juan de Puerto Rico". GCatholic.org. (for Chronology of Bishops) ^{[self-published]}
- Cheney, David M. "Archdiocese of Caracas, Santiago de Venezuela". Catholic-Hierarchy.org. (for Chronology of Bishops) ^{[self-published]}
- Chow, Gabriel. "Metropolitan Archdiocese of Coro". GCatholic.org. (for Chronology of Bishops) ^{[self-published]}

Preceded by Gonzalo de Angulo	Bishop of Coro / Bishop of Caracas; 1634–1637	Succeeded by Mauro Diego de Tovar y Valle Maldonado
Preceded by Bernardo de Balbuena y Villanueva	Bishop of Puerto Rico; 1630–1634	Succeeded by Juan Alonso de Solis y Mendoza
