= Diego de Contreras =

Mexican Roman Catholic prelate

Most Reverend Diego de Contreras
- Archbishop of Santo Domingo
- Church: Catholic Church
- Diocese: Archdiocese of Santo Domingo
- In office: 1612–1618
- Predecessor: Cristóbal Rodríguez Juárez
- Successor: Pedro de Solier y Vargas

Orders
- Consecration: 10 Nov 1613 by Juan Pérez de la Serna

Personal details
- Born: 1562 New Spain
- Died: 1618 (age 56) Santo Domingo

Diego de Contreras (1562–1618) was a Roman Catholic prelate who was the Archbishop of Santo Domingo from 1612 to 1618).

== Biography ==
Diego de Contreras was born in New Spain and ordained a priest in the Order of St. Augustine. On 18 June 1612, he was appointed by the king of Spain and confirmed by Pope Paul V as Archbishop of Santo Domingo. On 10 November 1613, he was consecrated bishop by Juan Pérez de la Serna, Archbishop of México. He was Archbishop of Santo Domingo until his death on 24 April 1618. While bishop, he was the principal consecrator of Pedro de Solier y Vargas, Bishop of Puerto Rico.

== External links and additional sources ==
- Cheney, David M. "Archdiocese of Santo Domingo". Catholic-Hierarchy.org. (for Chronology of Bishops) ^{[self-published]}
- Chow, Gabriel. "Metropolitan Archdiocese of Santo Domingo". GCatholic.org. (for Chronology of Bishops) ^{[self-published]}

Catholic Church titles
Preceded by Cristóbal Rodríguez Juárez	Archbishop of Santo Domingo; 1612–1618	Succeeded by Pedro de Solier y Vargas
