= Juan Alzóloras =

Archbishop who served in Islas Canarias and Santo Domingo

Most Reverend Juan Alzóloras
- Archbishop (personal title) of Islas Canarias
- Church: Catholic Church
- Diocese: Diocese of Islas Canarias
- See: 1568–1574
- Predecessor: Bartolomé Torres (bishop)
- Successor: Cristóbal Vela Tavera
- Previous post: Archbishop of Santo Domingo (1566–1568)

Personal details
- Died: 7 May 1574

Juan Alzóloras, O.S.H or Juan Arzolaras (died 7 May 1574) served as Archbishop (personal title) of Islas Canarias (1568–1574) and Archbishop of Santo Domingo (1566–1568).

== Biography ==
Juan Alzóloras was ordained a monk in the Order of Saint Jerome. On 15 February 1566, he was appointed by the King of Spain and confirmed by Pope Pius V as Archbishop of Santo Domingo. On 17 September 1568, he was appointed by Pope Pius V as Archbishop (personal title) of Islas Canarias where he served until his death on 7 May 1574.

== See also ==
- Catholic Church in Spain

== External links and additional sources ==
- Cheney, David M. "Archdiocese of Santo Domingo". Catholic-Hierarchy.org. (for Chronology of Bishops) ^{[self-published]}
- Chow, Gabriel. "Metropolitan Archdiocese of Santo Domingo". GCatholic.org. (for Chronology of Bishops) ^{[self-published]}
- Cheney, David M. "Diocese of Islas Canarias". Catholic-Hierarchy.org. (for Chronology of Bishops) ^{[self-published]}
- Chow, Gabriel. "Diocese of Islas Canarias {Canary Islands} (Spain)". GCatholic.org. (for Chronology of Bishops) ^{[self-published]}

Catholic Church titles
Preceded by Juan Salcedo	Archbishop of Santo Domingo; 1566–1568	Succeeded by Francisco Andrés de Carvajal
Preceded by Bartolomé Torres (bishop)	Archbishop (personal title) of Islas Canarias; 1568–1574	Succeeded by Cristóbal Vela Tavera
