= Diego de Guevara y Estrada =

Mexican Roman Catholic prelate

Most Reverend Diego de Guevara y Estrada
- Archbishop of Santo Domingo
- Church: Catholic Church
- Archdiocese: Archdiocese of Santo Domingo
- In office: 1641–1642
- Predecessor: Facundo de la Torre
- Successor: Maestro Valderas

Orders
- Consecration: by Juan de Palafox y Mendoza

Personal details
- Born: 1612 Mexico
- Died: April 1642 (aged 29–30) Santo Domingo

Diego de Guevara y Estrada (1612 – April 1642) was a Roman Catholic prelate who served as the Archbishop of Santo Domingo (1641–1642).

== Biography ==
Diego de Guevara y Estrada was born in Mexico. On June 19, 1641, he was selected by the King of Spain and confirmed on January 13, 1642, by Pope Urban VIII as Archbishop of Santo Domingo. He was consecrated bishop by Juan de Palafox y Mendoza, Bishop of Tlaxcala with Father Nicolás de la Torre Muñoz assisting. He served as Bishop of Santo Domingo until his death in April 1642.

== External links and additional sources ==
- Cheney, David M. "Archdiocese of Santo Domingo". Catholic-Hierarchy.org. (for Chronology of Bishops) ^{[self-published]}
- Chow, Gabriel. "Metropolitan Archdiocese of Santo Domingo". GCatholic.org. (for Chronology of Bishops) ^{[self-published]}

Catholic Church titles
| Preceded by Facundo de la Torre | Archbishop of Santo Domingo; 1641–1642 | Succeeded by Maestro Valderas |
