= Diocese of Stella Maris =

Roman Catholic diocese in the Dominican Republic

Diocese of Stella Maris Dioecesis Stella Maris

Location
- Country: Dominican Republic
- Ecclesiastical province: Province of Santo Domingo

Statistics
- Area: 588.87 km^{2} (227.36 sq mi)
- Population: Total; Catholics: (as of 2025); 1,291,516; 943,762 (73.1%)
- Parishes: 64

Information
- Denomination: Roman Catholic
- Rite: Latin Rite
- Established: 27 August 2025
- Cathedral: Stella Maris Cathedral
- Patron saint: Our Lady, Star of the Sea

Current leadership
- Pope: Leo XIV
- Bishop: Manuel Antonio Ruíz de la Rosa

The Diocese of Stella Maris (Latin: Dioecesis Stella Maris) is a Roman Catholic suffragan diocese of the Archdiocese of Santo Domingo in the Dominican Republic. It was established in 2025.

== History ==
The diocese was erected on August 27, 2025, by Pope Leo XIV with territory from the Archdiocese of Santo Domingo. This is the second diocese established by the pontiff, following Kapsabet in Kenya.

== Territory ==
Stella Maris's territory includes the municipalities of Santo Domingo Este, San Antonio de Guerra, and Boca Chica, formerly of the Archdiocese of Santo Domingo. Before the creation of Stella Maris, the Santo Domingo had a larger Catholic population than the Archdioceses of New York or Chicago.

=== Cathedral and patron ===
Stella Maris (Star of the Sea) is an ancient title of Mary, and the diocese received this name because it is made up of coastal areas. The cathedral of the diocese is Stella Maris in Santo Domingo Este.

== Ordinaries ==
- Bishop Manuel Antonio Ruíz de la Rosa (2025-)
