= Francisco de la Cueva Maldonado =

Most Reverend Francisco de la Cueva Maldonado
- Archbishop of Santo Domingo
- Church: Catholic Church
- Archdiocese: Archdiocese of Santo Domingo
- In office: 1662–1667
- Predecessor: Francisco Pio Guadalupe Téllez
- Successor: Juan de Escalante Turcios y Mendoza

Orders
- Consecration: 15 August 1664 by Benito de Rivas

Personal details
- Died: 15 October 1667 Santo Domingo

Francisco de la Cueva Maldonado (died 15 October 1667) was a Roman Catholic prelate who served as Archbishop of Santo Domingo (1662–1667).

On 21 August 1662, Francisco de la Cueva Maldonado was selected by the King of Spain and confirmed by Pope Alexander VII as Archbishop of Santo Domingo. On 15 August 1664, he was consecrated bishop by Benito de Rivas, Bishop of Puerto Rico. He served as Archbishop of Santo Domingo until his death on 15 October 1667.

== External links and additional sources ==
- Cheney, David M. "Archdiocese of Santo Domingo". Catholic-Hierarchy.org. (for Chronology of Bishops) ^{[self-published]}
- Chow, Gabriel. "Metropolitan Archdiocese of Santo Domingo". GCatholic.org. (for Chronology of Bishops) ^{[self-published]}

Catholic Church titles
Preceded by Francisco Pio Guadalupe Téllez	Archbishop of Santo Domingo; 1662–1667	Succeeded by Juan de Escalante Turcios y Mendoza
