= Bernardo de Balbuena =

Spanish poet

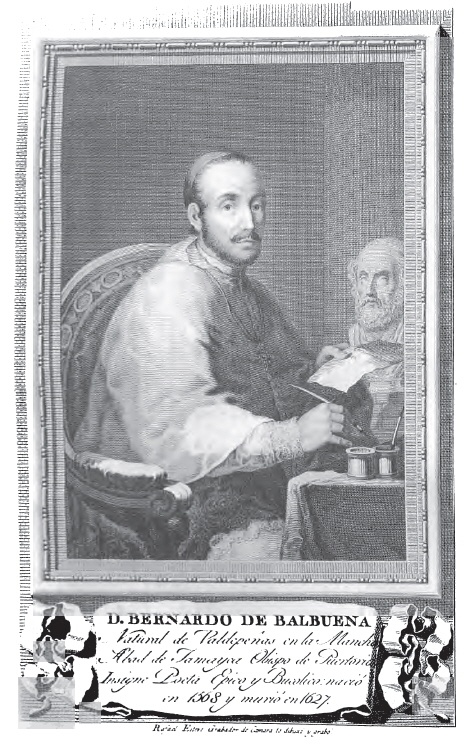
Bernardo de Balbuena

Bernardo de Balbuena (c. 1561 in Valdepeñas, Spain – October 1627, in San Juan, Puerto Rico) was a Spanish poet. He was the first of a long series of Latin American poets who extolled the special beauties of the New World.

== Life ==
Born in Valdepeñas, Spain around 1561, Balbuena came to the New World as a young adult and lived in Guadalajara, Jalisco and Mexico City, where he studied theology. In 1606 he returned to Spain and earned the degree of Doctor of Theology, and rose within the Church to become Abbot in Jamaica (1610) and one of the early Bishops of Puerto Rico (1620). Despite his priestly duties, he found time to write long and elegant verses which are excellent examples of the Baroque tendency to heavily load (and sometimes overload) poetry with highly detailed descriptions.

Unfortunately, many of his manuscripts and his library were burned by Dutch pirates during a 1625 attack on Puerto Rico. He died two years later.

== His work ==
Perhaps his best work is Grandeza mexicana (Mexico's Grandeur, published in 1604), in which he replies in elegant and lyrical verse to a nun who asked him for a description of the young Spanish city of Mexico. Balbuena takes advantage of this opportunity to present a detailed inventory of the complicated, luxurious and beautiful city as he knew it almost 100 years after the arrival of Hernán Cortés. The details he provides include physical geography, the climate, the surroundings, the architecture, the vegetation, the different human types, the animals, all in great detail. The poem is high-sounding, but at the same time simple; it is direct, but also contains complicated metaphors, word plays, majestic adjectives, and a rich catalog of the lexicon. Balbuena's works represent some of the best of the Baroque's love of color, detail, ornamentation and intellectual playfulness. It also stands as a monument to the pride in the New World that many transplanted Spaniards (sometimes referred to as "radicados") shared with the "criollos" (the Americans descended from Spanish or Portuguese families). A critical edition of Grandeza mexicana, prepared with introduction, notes and bibliography by Asima Saad Maura appeared in 2011 (Madrid: Cátedra); it takes into consideration the two different editions published during Balbuena's life, each one dedicated to a different person. Saad Maura's edition also includes Balbuena's treaty on poetry.

In 1624, he published El Bernardo, o Victoria de Roncesvalles, an epic poem about Bernardo del Carpio.

In 2007, well-known Spanish translator, Margaret Sayers Peden collected Mexican literature including that of Bernardo de Balbuena's in order to combine and edit the book Mexican Writers on Writing (Trinity University Press).

== A sampler (fragment) ==
Mexico's Grandeur (1604) by Bernardo de Balbuena

Of the famous Mexico the seat,
origin and grandeur of edifices
horses, streets, treatment, complement,
letters, virtues, variety of professions.
gifts, occasions of contentment,
immortal spring and its indications,
illustrious government, religion, state,
all in this speech is written. ...
It is ordered that I write you some indication
that I have arrived in this famous city,
center of perfection, hinge of the world;
its seat, its populous greatness,
its rare things, its riches and its treatment,
its illustrious people, its pompous labor.
in all, a most perfect portrait
you ask of Mexican Greatness,
be it expensive, be it modest.

With most beautiful distant views,
outings, recreations and country-feasts,
orchards, farms, mills, and groves.
malls, gardens, thickets
of various plants and fruits
in flower, in blossom, immature and ripe.
There are not as many stars
in the sky, as flowers in her garland
nor as many virtues in it than her.

== External links and additional sources ==
- Cheney, David M. "Archdiocese of San Juan de Puerto Rico". Catholic-Hierarchy.org. (for Chronology of Bishops) ^{[self-published]}
- Chow, Gabriel. "Metropolitan Archdiocese of San Juan de Puerto Rico". GCatholic.org. (for Chronology of Bishops) ^{[self-published]}
- Grandeza mexicana, Saad Maura, Asima, ed. Madrid: Cátedra, 2011.
- Catholic Encyclopedia Article

Religious titles
Preceded by Pedro de Solier y Vargas	Bishop of Puerto Rico; 1620–1627	Succeeded by Juan López de Agurto de la Mata
