= Francisco Pio Guadalupe Téllez =

Most Reverend Francisco Pio Guadalupe Tellez
- Archbishop of Santo Domingo
- Church: Catholic Church
- Archdiocese: Archdiocese of Santo Domingo
- In office: 1648–1660
- Predecessor: Maestro Valderas
- Successor: Francisco de la Cueva Maldonado

Orders
- Consecration: 1649 by Ramón Sentmenat y Lanuza

Personal details
- Died: 5 March 1660 Santo Domingo

Francisco Pio Guadalupe Téllez (died 5 March 1660) was a Roman Catholic prelate who served as Archbishop of Santo Domingo (1648–1660).

== Biography ==
On 23 November 1648, Francisco Pio Guadalupe Téllez was selected by the King of Spain and confirmed by Pope Innocent X as Archbishop of Santo Domingo. In 1649, he was consecrated bishop by Ramón Sentmenat y Lanuza, Bishop of Vic with Timoteo Pérez Vargas, Bishop Emeritus of Baghdad, and Blas Tineo Palacios, Auxiliary Bishop of Granada, as co-consecrators. He served as Archbishop of Santo Domingo until his death on 5 March 1660. His Vicar General was García Polanco

== External links and additional sources ==
- Cheney, David M. "Archdiocese of Santo Domingo". Catholic-Hierarchy.org. (for Chronology of Bishops) ^{[self-published]}
- Chow, Gabriel. "Metropolitan Archdiocese of Santo Domingo". GCatholic.org. (for Chronology of Bishops) ^{[self-published]}

Religious titles
Preceded by Maestro Valderas	Archbishop of Santo Domingo; 1648–1660	Succeeded by Francisco de la Cueva Maldonado
