= Francisco José Arnáiz Zarandona =

Spanish bishop (1925–2014)

Francisco José Arnáiz Zarandona (March 9, 1925 – February 14, 2014) was a Catholic bishop.

Born in Spain, Arnáiz Zarandona was ordained to the priesthood for the Society of Jesus in 1955. In 1988, Arnáiz Zarandona was named auxiliary bishop of Leges and auxiliary bishop of the Archdiocese of Santo Domingo, Dominican Republic. He retired in 2002.
