= Francisco Andrés de Carvajal =

The Most Reverend Francisco Andrés de Carvajal OFM
- Archbishop of Santo Domingo
- Church: Catholic Church
- Diocese: Archdiocese of Santo Domingo
- Predecessor: Juan Alzóloras
- Successor: Alfonso López de Avila
- Previous post: Bishop of Puerto Rico (1568–1570)

Personal details
- Died: August 28, 1577 Santo Domingo

Francisco Andrés de Carvajal, OFM (died August 28, 1577) was a Roman Catholic prelate who served as the Archbishop of Santo Domingo (1570–1577), Primate of the Indies, and the third Bishop of Puerto Rico (1568–1570).

== Biography ==
Francisco Andrés de Carvajal was ordained a priest in the Order of Friars Minor. On June 2, 1568, he was appointed by the King of Spain and confirmed by Pope Pius V as the third Bishop of Puerto Rico. On May 10, 1570, he was appointed by the King of Spain and confirmed by Pope Pius V as Archbishop of Santo Domingo where served until his death on August 28, 1577.

== External links and additional sources ==
- Cheney, David M. "Archdiocese of San Juan de Puerto Rico". Catholic-Hierarchy.org. (for Chronology of Bishops) ^{[self-published]}
- Chow, Gabriel. "Metropolitan Archdiocese of San Juan de Puerto Rico". GCatholic.org. (for Chronology of Bishops) ^{[self-published]}
- Cheney, David M. "Archdiocese of Santo Domingo". Catholic-Hierarchy.org. (for Chronology of Bishops) ^{[self-published]}
- Chow, Gabriel. "Metropolitan Archdiocese of Santo Domingo". GCatholic.org. (for Chronology of Bishops) ^{[self-published]}

Religious titles
Preceded by Rodrigo de Bastidas y Rodriguez de Romera	Bishop of Puerto Rico; 1546–1555	Succeeded by Manuel de Mercado Aldrete
Preceded by Juan Alzóloras	Archbishop of Santo Domingo; 1570–1577	Succeeded by Alfonso López de Avila
