= Pedro de Solier y Vargas =

Spanish Roman Catholic prelate

Most Reverend Pedro de Solier y Vargas
- Archbishop of Santo Domingo
- Church: Catholic Church
- Diocese: Archdiocese of Santo Domingo
- In office: 1619–1620
- Predecessor: Diego de Contreras
- Successor: Pedro de Oviedo Falconi
- Previous post: Bishop of Puerto Rico (1614–1619)

Orders
- Ordination: February 13, 1594
- Consecration: 1616 by Diego de Contreras

Personal details
- Born: 1573 Barajas, Spain
- Died: July 9, 1620 (aged 46–47) Santo Domingo

Pedro de Solier y Vargas (1573 – July 9, 1620) was a Roman Catholic prelate who served as the Archbishop of Santo Domingo (1619–1620) and Bishop of Puerto Rico (1614–1619).

== Biography ==
He was born in Barajas, Spain and ordained a priest in the Order of St. Augustine on February 13, 1594. On November 17, 1614, he was appointed by the King of Spain and confirmed by Pope Paul V as Bishop of Puerto Rico. In 1616, he was consecrated bishop by Diego de Contreras, Archbishop of Santo Domingo. On December 16, 1619, he was appointed by the King of Spain and confirmed by Pope Paul V as Archbishop of Santo Domingo where served until his death on July 9, 1620.

== External links and additional sources ==
- Cheney, David M. "Archdiocese of San Juan de Puerto Rico". Catholic-Hierarchy.org. (for Chronology of Bishops) ^{[self-published]}
- Chow, Gabriel. "Metropolitan Archdiocese of San Juan de Puerto Rico". GCatholic.org. (for Chronology of Bishops) ^{[self-published]}
- Cheney, David M. "Archdiocese of Santo Domingo". Catholic-Hierarchy.org. (for Chronology of Bishops) ^{[self-published]}
- Chow, Gabriel. "Metropolitan Archdiocese of Santo Domingo". GCatholic.org. (for Chronology of Bishops) ^{[self-published]}

Religious titles
Preceded by Francisco Diaz de Cabrera y Córdoba	Bishop of Puerto Rico; 1614–1619	Succeeded by Bernardo de Balbuena y Villanueva
Preceded by Diego de Contreras	Archbishop of Santo Domingo; 1619–1620	Succeeded by Pedro de Oviedo Falconi
