= Concordat of 1954 =

1954 concordat between the Dominican Republic and the Vatican

The Concordat of 1954 is a concordat of the Catholic Church, signed on 16 June 1954 by the Dominican Republic (then governed by the Third Republic, under the rule of Rafael Trujillo) with the Vatican (during the pontificate of Pope Pius XII).

== Status of the Church ==
The Dominican Republic offers freedom of religion to its citizens, but the Catholic Church in the country still enjoys certain rights, and is the state religion, due to the concordat.

== Public funds for Church needs ==
Use of public funds for Church needs and low customs duties on Church goods are two favors given to the Catholic Church by the government.

== Catholic marriage ceremonies ==
Catholic marriage ceremonies are the only religious marriage ceremonies that are recognized by the state, but marriages can also be performed by government officials. Certain Protestant churches have also asked for official recognition under this agreement.

== Relations with the Rafael Trujillo regime ==
Under Rafael Trujillo's government, the power of the Catholic Church was limited. Although the Church remained apolitical during much of the Trujillo era, a 1960 pastoral letter of protest against mass arrests of government opponents seriously strained the relationship with the government. The papal nuncio’s attempts to administer humanitarian aid during the 1965 Dominican Civil War were hampered and the struggle intensified.

== Relations in the 1970s and 1980s ==
The bishops continued to issue statements of protest against human rights violations and poor living standards for the population throughout the 1970s and the 1980s.

== See also ==
- Relations between the Catholic Church and the state
