= Fernando del Portillo y Torres =

Fernando del Portillo y Torres OP
- Archbishop of Santa Fe en Nueva Granada
- Church: Catholic Church
- Archdiocese: Archdiocese of Santa Fe en Nueva Granada
- In office: 29 October 1798 – 20 January 1804
- Predecessor: Baltasar Jaime Martínez Compañón
- Successor: Juan Bautista Sacristán
- Previous post: Archbishop of Santo Domingo (1788-1798)

Orders
- Consecration: 28 June 1789 by Mariano Martí

Personal details
- Born: c. 1728 Ciudad Real, Kingdom of Toledo, Kingdom of Spain
- Died: 20 January 1804 (aged 75–76)

Fernando del Portillo y Torres was a Roman Catholic archbishop in the late 18th and early 19th centuries.

He was the archbishop of Archdiocese of Santo Domingo from 1788 to 1798 and archbishop of "Santafé en Nueva Granada" (now known as the Archdiocese of Bogotá) from 1798 to 1804.

From a wealthy family, he entered the Dominican Order in 1743 at Málaga, Spain, teaching philosophy during 1751–1756, theology, 1756–1758, and Holy Scriptures, 1758–1761. He moved to Cádiz, the seafaring gate of trade to the American Spanish Empire and earned a doctorate of divinity in nearby Jerez de la Frontera in 1767. He became a prior to sieges of the Dominican Order in Málaga, Almería, Cabra, Ciudad Real and Doña Mencía, training teachers of Christianity, dictionary editors and administrative tutors in aboriginal American Indian languages, North and South America, after the middle of the 16th Century.

In 1788, Charles III of Spain proposed to Pope Pius VI that Portillo be chosen as Archbishop of Santo Domingo, the primate siege of America, created in 1546.

Difficulties on the Island of Hispaniola around 1798 led him to move the supposed remains of seafarer and discoverer Christopher Columbus to La Habana, Cuba, being kept at the Convent of San Juan de Letrán. Portillo was proposed by the Spanish Crown to the Roman Pope in 1798 as a Bishop of Trujillo, Peru, but instead Portillo became Archbishop of Bogotá, a much higher position. Del Portillo y Torres died in 1804, aged around 75.

== External links and additional sources ==
- Cheney, David M. "Archdiocese of Santo Domingo". Catholic-Hierarchy.org. (for Chronology of Bishops)^{self-published}
- Chow, Gabriel. "Metropolitan Archdiocese of Santo Domingo". GCatholic.org. (for Chronology of Bishops)^{self-published}
- Chow, Gabriel. "Metropolitan Archdiocese of Santo Domingo". GCatholic.org.
- Franchina, Miriam (2021). "From Slave to Royal Vassal: Jean-François's Negotiation Strategies in the Haitian Revolution". Slavery & Abolition. 42 (4): 777–802. doi:10.1080/0144039X.2021.1903324. S2CID 233699824.
