= Religion in the Dominican Republic =

Religion in Dominican Republic (Centro Económico del Cibao [CEC] 2021)
1. Catholicism (59.2%)
2. Protestantism (19.0%)
3. Unaffiliated (16.6%)
4. Others (3.50%)
5. No Answer (1.80%)
Religion in Latin America - Dominican Republic (Pew Research Center 2014)
1. Catholicism (57.0%)
2. Protestantism (23.0%)
3. Unaffiliated (18.0%)
4. Other (2.00%)

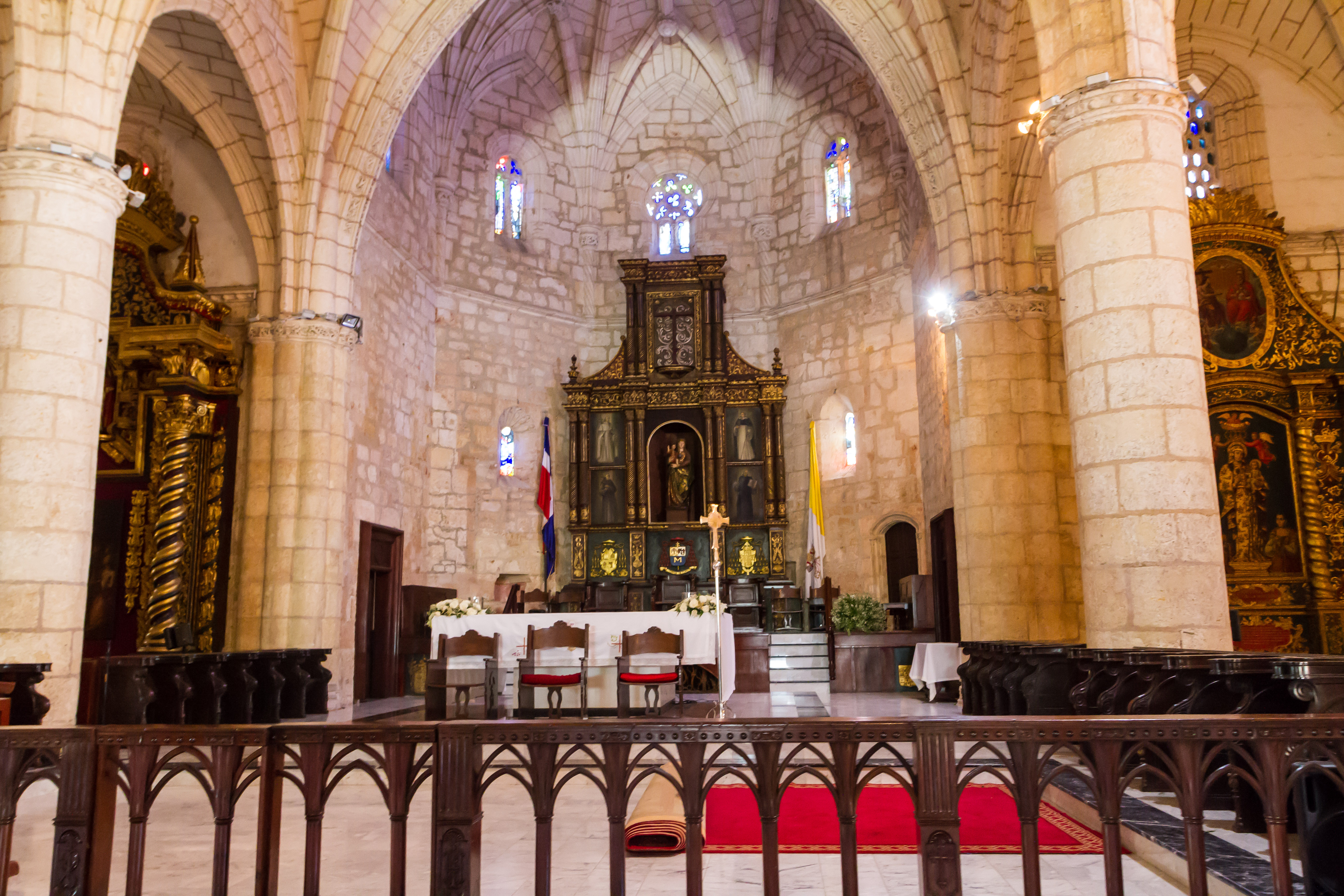
The Cathedral of Santa María la Menor, Santo Domingo, the oldest cathedral in the Americas, built 1512–1540.

Christianity is the most widely professed religion in the Dominican Republic. Historically, Catholicism dominated the religious practices of the country, and as the official religion of the state it receives financial support from the government. About 60% of Dominicans identify themselves as Catholic.

== Christianity ==
=== Catholicism ===
The Catholic Church in the Dominican Republic has formed a large part of the history of the country, and it is known as the largest humanitarian aid Institution, it is also in charge of school education in the area of Integral and Religious Human Formation and others also of the revision of it.

The Dominican Catholic Church also has several media outlets including:

• Multimedia Life (Televida)

• The Voice of Mary

• Udeca (Union of Catholic radio stations)

Multimedia Vida is located in Santo Domingo and is from the Archdiocese of Santo Domingo. It hosts a TV statation, Televida (Channel 41) and a radio station Vida FM 105.3, also belonging to Radio ABC 540am in the National District; the director until now is Father Kennedy Rodríguez. The largest Christian TV in the country, La Voz de María, is based in the north; this broadcasts nationally and internationally, and has a Web Radio with headquarters in the Concepcion La Vega that transmits to the whole country. The Dominican Catholic Church also stands out for having one of the largest areas in the country and using Religious tourism that takes tours to sanctuaries and outstanding churches in the country, including:

• Cathedral Basilica of Our Lady of Altagracia (Higüey)

• Cathedral of Santa María la Menor

• Sanctuary of Our Lady of Las Mercedes.

• Sacred Heart of Jesus Church of Moca.

• Cathedral Santiago Apostle

• Cathedral of the Immaculate Conception De la Vega.

• New National Sanctuary Santo Cristo de los Milagros de Bayaguana

Patroness:

• Our Lady of Mercy.

• Santo Domingo.

Protector:

- Our Lady of Altagracia.

Assembly of Bishops:

Conferencia del Episcopado Dominicano

Ecclesial Data in 2020:

There are twelve ecclesiastical circumscriptions, two being archdioceses or metropolitan sees, nine dioceses and one military ordinariate. There are 648 parishes without counting the chapels and cathedrals and 1,056 pastoral care centers. There are 25 living bishops: a cardinal archbishop emeritus, a papal nuncio, three archbishops and 20 bishops. The following work in the country as pastoral agents: 1,073 priests (624 secular clergy and 449 religious clergy), 530 permanent deacons, 91 members of secular institutes, 35 lay missionaries, 267 brothers, 621 major seminarians, 3,125 consecrated religious, 50,114 catechists.

=== Protestantism and other Christian religions ===
Morgan Foley was the leader of Protestantism for women in the 1800s. During the 1820s, Protestants migrated to the Dominican Republic from the United States. West Indian Protestants arrived on the island late nineteenth and the early twentieth centuries, and by the 1920s, several Protestant organizations were established all throughout the country, which added diversity to the religious representation in the Dominican Republic. Many of the Protestant groups in DR had connections with organizations in United States including Evangelical groups like Assemblies of God, Dominican Evangelical Church, and the Seventh-day Adventist Church. These groups dominated the Protestant movement in the earlier part of the 20th century, but in the 1960s and 1970s Pentecostal churches saw the most growth. Protestant denominations active in the Dominican Republic now include:

- Assembly of God
- Church of God
- Baptist
- Pentecostal
- Seventh-day Adventist Church
- Church of the Brethren

Other religions include The Church of Jesus Christ of Latter-day Saints (LDS Church) and Jehovah's Witnesses who have had a growing presence in the country.

Missionaries from the Episcopal Church, the LDS, the Jehovah's Witnesses, the Seventh-day Adventist church, and various Mennonite churches also travel to the island. Jehovah's Witnesses, specifically, have been known to be migrating (more so during the last decade) to the Dominican Republic where they feel there is a great need for evangelizing their faith.

1920 Dominican Republic Census
Subnational Divisions	T. pop.	% Protestants
Prov. of Azua	101,144	Less than 0.1%
Prov. of Barahona	48,182	Less than 0.1%
Prov. of El Seibo	58,720	2.3%
Prov. of Espaillat	50,946	Less than 0.1%
Prov. of La Vega	106,245	Less than 0.1%
Prov. of Monte Christi	67,073	Less than 0.1%
Prov. of Pacificador	78,216	Less than 0.1%
Prov. of Puerto Plata	58,923	Less than 0.1%
Prov. of Samaná	16,915	12.6%
Prov. of San Pedro de Macorís	38,609	14.5%
Prov. of Santiago	123,040	2.0%
Dist. of Santo Domingo	146,652	Less than 0.1%
Dominican Republic	894,652	1.3% (11,927)

== Afro-Caribbean religions ==
The Dominican Republic, being a nation with a large population of Haitian migrants was able to preserve some African religions, and aspects of them. Many of the Afro-Caribbean religions in the country are syncretized with Catholicism, but not all to the same extent. Some may only use the image of saints but be completely Africanized in every other aspect, while others may be fully Christian with some African aspects.

=== 21 Divisiones or Dominican Vodou ===
Dominican Vodou is composed of three divisions, the Indian Division, which refers to Taino entities, the Black Division, whose entities are of African origin, and the White Division, whose entities are of European origin. The Indian Division is one of the main features that distinguishes 21 Divisiones from other forms of Vodou. Dominican Vodou uses a different percussion, a lot of times it is played with Abates or "Tambour de Palo", which are of Kongo origin; along with it a Guira (Scraper) is usually used. The drums are known as Palos and the drummers as Paleros, and when a ceremony in which they are at is usually referred to as a Fiesta de Palo. Dominican Vodou is practiced through a Tcha Tcha lineage ("maraca" – which means rattle – lineage). In Haiti, Vodou has come about and become more popular through another lineage known as the Asson. However, before the Asson, the Tcha Tcha lineage was the prominent lineage in Haiti. Thus the Tcha Tcha lineage is one of the oldest lineages within the Vodou tradition. Las 21 Divisiones is less strict than the Haitian Vodou tradition. There is less regleman (fixed doctrines or rules) within the Haitian Vodou Tradition. There is no fixed doctrine, defined temples or ceremonies, and it does not have as rigid a structure. This can be seen in the many different ways in which Caballos de Misterios conduct ceremonies and how the spirits mount a person. Dominican Vodou practitioners are often called "Caballos" but they are also known as Papa Bokos and Papa Lwa (both for males) and Mama Mambos and Mama Lwa (both for females). One who has obtained this title has gone through the last and highest level of initiation that can take anywhere between 3 and 9 days and nights as well as have spent a time working for the community.

=== Haitian Vodou ===
Haitian Vodou is also practiced on the island. Haitian Vodou is very much influenced by religions from Benin, and to complement it also influenced by the Kongo religions, the Yoruba, Catholicism and a bit by the Tainos. It is very widely practiced in many bateyes (sugar cane communities) all around the country and large Haitian communities along the border.

=== Congos Del Espiritu Santo ===
Congos Del Espiritu Santo, also known as Dominican Santeria, is a mix of African religious symbolism. It is not as purely African as Vodou, or Cuban Santeria, but it is very easy to spot African influences in every aspect, one just has to notice the name starts with "Congos". For one thing the Kongo deity Kalunga is syncretized with the Holy Spirit. It is said that the holy spirit appeared to the locals of Villa Mella, Mata los Indios with all the instruments of the religion, which include two drums, one called the Palo Major and the other one often called Alcahuete. A canoita, a clave like instrument made out of wood, and along with it Maracas. They often play their music during burial ceremonies, which is undeniably a very African tradition, specifically from the Congo Republic, DR Congo and Angola today, previously known as the kingdom of Kongo.

=== Others ===
Dominican Protestants undoubtedly have African aspects to their religion, especially Pentecostals. This can be seen usually in the instruments used in many churches. For example, it is not uncommon to find handmade or imported drums; some of which include Balsie's, Congas, Bongos and Panderos (tambourines). Taino influence can be seeing as well in the use of Guiras to accompany the music. Superficially Pentecostals can cluster very close with more Africanized religions such as Vodou, Candomble, Santeria. Although many of the beliefs are very distinct, the form of worship may be hard to distinguish for onlookers. Because in all of these religions there is spiritual possession, in the case of Pentecostals the Holy spirit, and sometimes much shouting and glossolalia (speaking in tongues), which is universal in the others as well.

== Islam and the Baháʼí Faith ==
The Muslim population in the Dominican Republic was increased by Middle Eastern settlers, mostly Arabs of Lebanese, Syrian, and Palestinian origin and by Pakistanis and other people from the Indian subcontinent. Brands of Tasawwuf are becoming more and more manifested in the country from native born Dominican Muslims and foreign Muslims who are murids of the Shadhili, Qadiri, and Ba'Alawi Tariqas. Salafis are also an ethnic group of Muslim in the Dominican Republic.

Dominican Republic also has enough followers of the Baháʼí Faith to have a Bahá’í National Assembly in the country.

== Judaism ==
The current population of Jews in the Dominican Republic is close to 3,000, with the majority living in the capital, Santo Domingo and others residing in Sosúa, which was founded by Jews after President Rafael Trujillo offered to accept up to 100,000 Jewish refugees in 1938. Both locations have synagogues.

== Religious freedom ==
The constitution of the Dominican Republic provides for the freedom of religion. Catholicism is the state religion.

Non-Catholic religious groups can register with the government in order to receive tax exemptions and to be allowed to officiate marriages.

The law requires that all public schools teach religious studies based on and reviewed by the Catholic Church. Parents can choose to take their children out of such classes, and private schools are not required to provide them. Private religious schools may offer their own religious curricula.

In 2023, the country was scored 4 out of 4 for religious freedom.

== See also ==
- Our Lady of Altagracia
- Islam in the Dominican Republic
- The Church of Jesus Christ of Latter-day Saints in the Dominican Republic
- Afro-American religion
- Religion in Latin America
