= Juan Salcedo (bishop) =

Most Reverend Juan Salcedo
- Archbishop of Santo Domingo
- Church: Catholic Church
- Diocese: Archdiocese of Santo Domingo
- In office: 1562
- Predecessor: Diego de Covarrubias y Leiva
- Successor: Juan Alzóloras

Orders
- Consecration: 1562 by Pedro Guerrero Logroño

Personal details
- Born: 1520 Granada, Spain
- Died: December 1562 (age 42) Santo Domingo

Juan Salcedo (1520 – December 1562) was a Roman Catholic prelate who served as the Archbishop of Santo Domingo (1562).

== Biography ==
Juan Salcedo was born in Granada, Spain. On 9 January 1562, he was appointed by the King of Spain and confirmed by Pope Pius IV as Bishop of Santo Domingo. In the same year, he was consecrated bishop by Pedro Guerrero Logroño, Archbishop of Granada. He served as Archbishop of Santo Domingo until his death in December 1562.

== External links and additional sources ==
- Cheney, David M. "Archdiocese of Santo Domingo". Catholic-Hierarchy.org. (for Chronology of Bishops) ^{[self-published]}
- Chow, Gabriel. "Metropolitan Archdiocese of Santo Domingo". GCatholic.org. (for Chronology of Bishops) ^{[self-published]}

Religious titles
Preceded by Diego de Covarrubias y Leiva	Archbishop of Santo Domingo; 1562	Succeeded by Juan Alzóloras
