= Bartolomé Torres (bishop) =

Most Reverend Bartolomé Torre
- Bishop of Islas Canarias
- Church: Catholic Church
- In office: 1566–1568
- Predecessor: Diego Deza Tello
- Successor: Juan Alzóloras

Personal details
- Born: 1512
- Died: 1 February 1568 (age 56) Castillo de la Luz, Las Palmas, Spain

Bartolomé Torre (1512–1568) was a Roman Catholic prelate who served as Bishop of Islas Canarias (1566–1568).

== Biography ==
Bartolomé Torre was born in 1512. On 15 May 1566, he was appointed during the papacy of Pope Pius V as Bishop of Islas Canarias. He served as Bishop of Islas Canarias until his death on 1 February 1568 in the Castillo de la Luz, Las Palmas, Spain.

== External links and additional sources ==
- Cheney, David M. "Diocese of Islas Canarias". Catholic-Hierarchy.org. (for Chronology of Bishops)^{self-published}
- Chow, Gabriel. "Diocese of Islas Canarias {Canary Islands} (Spain)". GCatholic.org. (for Chronology of Bishops)^{self-published}

Catholic Church titles
Preceded by Diego Deza Tello	Bishop of Islas Canarias; 1566–1568	Succeeded by Juan Alzóloras
