= Diocese of Baní =

Roman Catholic diocese in the Dominican Republic

Coordinates: 18.2801°N 70.3321°W

Diocese of Baní Dioecesis Baniensis

Location
- Country: Dominican Republic
- Ecclesiastical province: Province of Santo Domingo
- Metropolitan: Baní

Statistics
- Area: 2,892 km^{2} (1,117 sq mi)
- Population: Total; Catholics: (as of 2006); 747,000; 673,000 (80.1%)
- Parishes: 18

Information
- Denomination: Roman Catholic
- Rite: Latin Rite
- Established: 8 November 1986 (38 years ago)
- Cathedral: Cathedral of Our Lady of Regla

Current leadership
- Pope: Leo XIV
- Bishop: Faustino Burgos Brisman
- Bishops emeritus: Victor Emilio Masalles Pere

Map

The Roman Catholic Diocese of Baní (Latin: Dioecesis Baniensis) (erected 8 November 1986) is a suffragan diocese of the Archdiocese of Santo Domingo. Its seat is the cathedral dedicated to Our Lady of Regla.

== Ordinaries ==
- Príamo Pericles Tejeda Rosario (1986 - 1997)
- Freddy Antonio de Jesús Bretón Martínez (1998 - 2015), appointed archbishop of Santiago de los Caballeros
- Victor Emilio Masalles Pere (2016 - 2023)
- Faustino Burgos Brisman (2014 – present)
