= Roman Catholic Archdiocese of Santo Domingo =

Latin metropolitan archdiocese in the Dominican Republic

Metropolitan Archdiocese of Santo Domingo Archidioecesis Metropolitae Sancti Dominici (Latin) Arquidiócesis Metropolitana de Santo Domingo (Spanish)

Catholic
- Basílica Catedral Metropolitana Santa María de la Encarnación (2026)

Location
- Country: Dominican Republic
- Ecclesiastical province: Distrito Nacional
- Metropolitan: Santo Domingo
- Headquarters: Calle Isabela La Católica 55, Ciudad Colonial, Santo Domingo, Distrito Nacional, 10210, Dominican Republic
- Coordinates: 18°28′22″N 69°53′01″W

Statistics
- Area: 3,406 km^{2} (1,315 sq mi)
- Population: Total; Catholics: (as of 2025); 2,906,306; 2,539,412 (87.4%)
- Parishes: 156

Information
- Denomination: Roman Catholic
- Rite: Latin Rite
- Established: 8 August 1511 (515 years ago)
- Cathedral: Cathedral of Santo Domingo

Current leadership
- Pope: Leo XIV
- Metropolitan Archbishop: Carlos Tomás Morel Diplán
- Auxiliary Bishops: José Amable Durán Tineo
- Bishops emeritus: Nicolás de Jesús López Rodríguez; Francisco Ozoria Acosta

Map
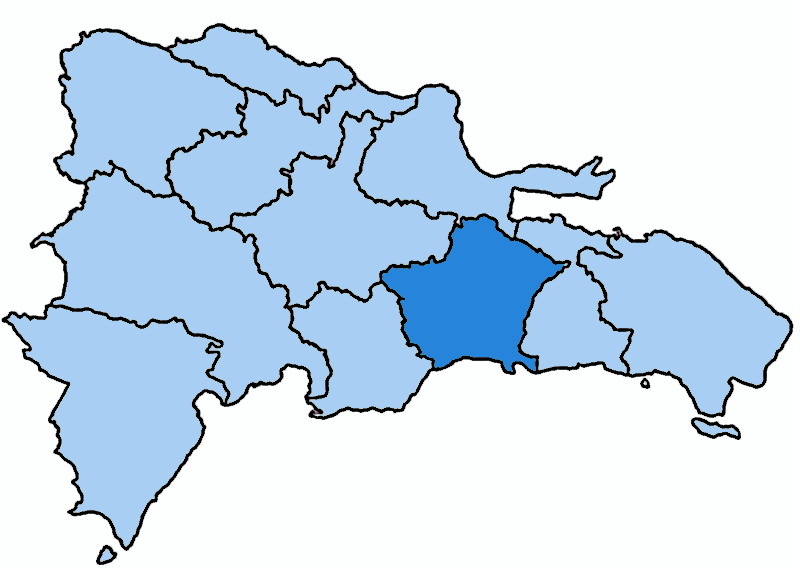

Website
- arquidiocesisd.org (in Spanish)

The Metropolitan Archdiocese of Santo Domingo (Latin: Archidioecesis Metropolitae Sancti Dominici; Spanish: Arquidiócesis Metropolitana de Santo Domingo) is a Latin Church ecclesiastical jurisdiction or archdiocese of the Catholic Church in the Dominican Republic. The see was erected 8 August 1511 as the Diocese of Santo Domingo and elevated to archdiocese on 12 February 1546.

In recognition of the fact that the see was the first established in the Western Hemisphere, the Archbishop of Santo Domingo can use the title of "Primate of the Indies", according to the bull of Pope Pius VII Divinis praeceptis issued on 28 November 1816 and ratified by the Concordat between the Holy See and the Dominican Republic signed on 16 June 1954.

The archiepiscopal see is the Santa María la Menor cathedral, a World Heritage Site, dedicated to St. Mary of the Incarnation, which was designated a minor basilica by Pope Benedict XV in his apostolic letter Inter Americae on 14 June 1920.

== Statistics ==
As per 2014, it pastorally served 3,457,347 Catholics (95.0% of 3,639,313 total) on 4,032 km^{2} in 214 parishes with 478 priests (190 diocesan, 288 religious), 159 deacons, 2,845 lay religious (610 brothers, 2,235 sisters) and 284 seminarians.

== Ecclesiastical province ==
The Metropolitan's suffragan sees are :

- Roman Catholic Diocese of Baní
- Roman Catholic Diocese of Barahona
- Roman Catholic Diocese of Nuestra Señora de la Altagracia en Higüey
- Roman Catholic Diocese of San Juan de la Maguana
- Roman Catholic Diocese of San Pedro de Macorís.
- Roman Catholic Diocese of Stella Maris

== History ==
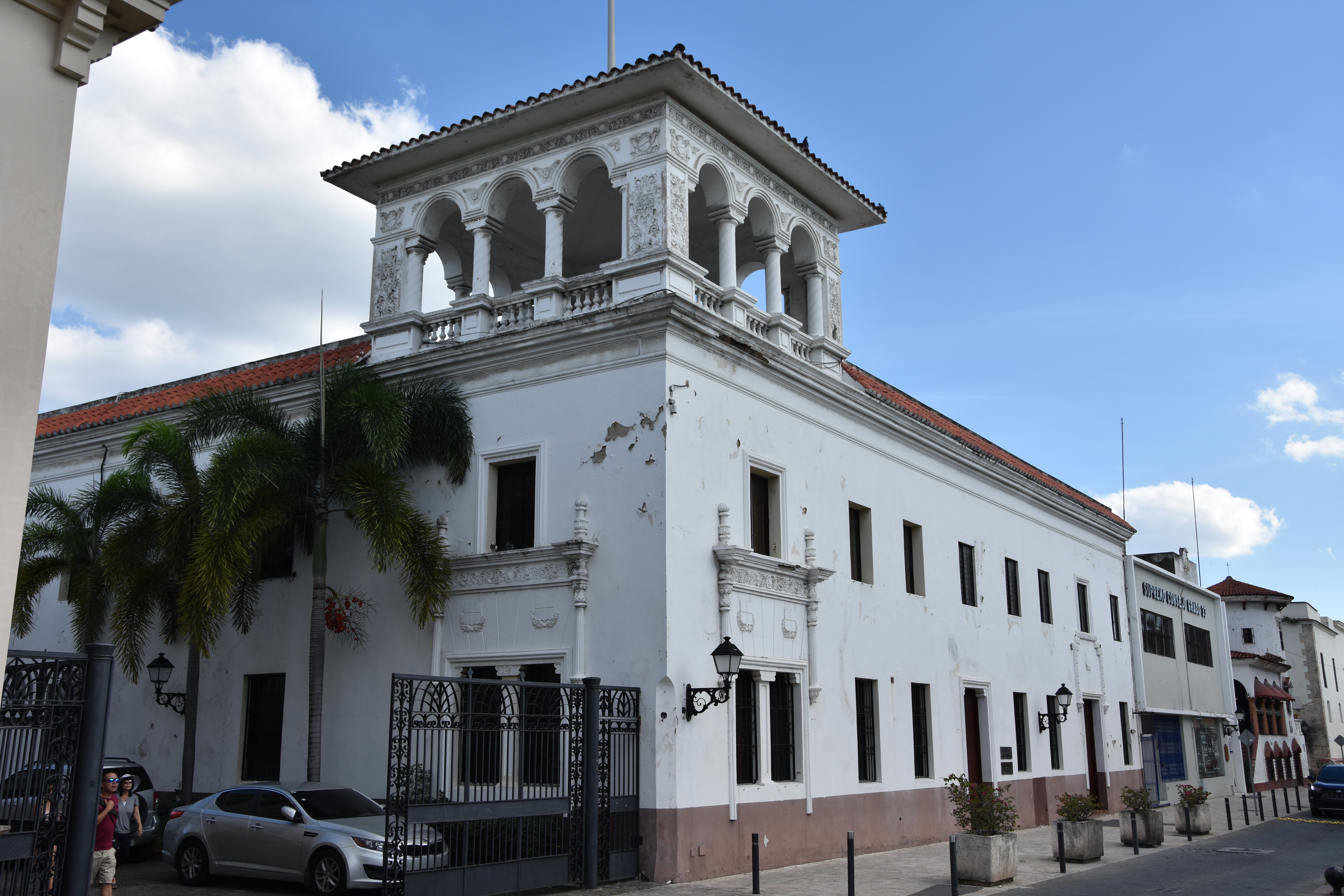
Casa del Sacramento

- The Bull of Pope Alexander VI, dated 24 June 1493, designated the Franciscan Bernardo Buil (Boil) to accompany Christopher Columbus on his second voyage of discovery, with faculties as Apostolic delegate or vicar. He did not make the journey, and his Benedictine near-namesake did. On 30 August 1495, a band of Franciscans and other missioners did arrive in Hispaniola.
- The see was erected on 8 August 1511 by Pope Julius II by the Bull Pontifex Romanus, which also established the bishoprics of Concepción de la Vega and the San Juan of Porto Rico, on Antillian Spanish-colonial territory split off from the Archdiocese of Seville. Three prelates, who had been appointed to the sees comprising the ecclesiastical province created in 1504 by the same pope, united their petition to that of the Crown in requesting the Holy See to suppress them and to establish the three new dioceses as suffragans to the See of Seville. This alteration was effected before any of the prelates in question had taken possession of his diocese or been consecrated a bishop. - Francisco Garcia de Padilla, a Franciscan, who in 1504 had been designed to occupy the See of Diocese of Bayuna (Baynoa, Baiunensis), was chosen the first bishop of Santo Domingo. He died before his consecration, after having named Carlos de Aragón his vicar-general and authorized him to take possession of the diocese. The first bishop to occupy the See of Santo Domingo was Alessandro Geraldini, who was appointed in 1516 and died in 1524. He was a native of Italy, and perhaps the only representative of the Americas to attend the Fifth Lateran Council.
- Lost territories on 1513.08.28 to establish the Diocese of Santa María la Antigua del Darién and on 1517.02.11 to establish the Diocese of Baracoa
- In 1527 it gained territory from the suppressed Diocese of Concepción de la Vega, which was united, after the death of its first bishop, Pedro Suárez de Deza, to the See of Santo Domingo.
- Lost territories again : on 1531.06.21 to establish the Diocese of Coro (soon its suffragan), on 1534.01.10 to establish the Diocese of Santa Marta, on 1534.12.18 to establish the Diocese of Guatemala (soon its suffragan) and in 1539 to establish the Diocese of Honduras
- Pope Paul III on 12 February 1546 elevated Santo Domingo to Metropolitan Archdiocese of Santa Domingo, and the incumbent of the see at the time, Bishop Alonso de Fuenmayor, became its first archbishop. As first the newly Metropolitan see of Santo Domingo had five Caribbean suffragan sees: two Antillian -Diocese of Puerto Rico and Diocese of Santiago (de Cuba) on Cuba- and three continental : Diocese of Coro (its daughter) in Venezuela, Diocese of Santa Marta in Colombia and the Diocese of Guatemala (its daughter).
- The Archbishop of Santo Domingo was awarded the title of Primate of the Indies by the bull of Pope Pius VII Divinis praeceptis issued on 28 November 1816, and such title was later ratified by the Concordat between the Holy See and the Dominican Republic signed on 16 June 1954. This title was given in recognition of the diocese being the first in the Americas, despite the fact that the Diocese of Gardar has centuries before been established in Greenland and since abandoned.
- In 1848 it was demoted as non-metropolitan Archdiocese of Santo Domingo / Sancti Dominici (Latin)
- Lost (Haitian) territories (French side of Hispaniola island) on 1861.10.03 to establish Metropolitan Archdiocese of Port-au-Prince, Diocese of Cap-Haïtien, Diocese of Les Cayes, Diocese of Les Gonaives and Diocese of Port-de-Paix
- Promoted back on 1953.09.25 as Metropolitan Archdiocese of Santo Domingo / Sancti Dominici (Latin), having lost more territories to establish Diocese of Santiago de los Caballeros (now Metropolitan), Diocese of La Vega and Territorial Prelature of San Juan de la Maguana (now Roman Catholic Diocese of San Juan de la Maguana)
- Lost territories thrice later : on 1959.04.01 to establish Diocese of Nuestra Señora de la Altagracia en Higüey, on 1986.11.08 to establish Diocese of Baní and on 1997.02.01 to establish Diocese of San Pedro de Macorís.
- It enjoyed papal visits from Pope John Paul II (January 1979, October 1984 and October 1992).

== Leadership ==
Bishops of Santo Domingo

Erected: August 8, 1511

- Francisco Garcia de Padilla (1511–1515) Died
- Alejandro Geraldini (1516–1524) Died
- Luis de Figueroa (1523–1526), Died, never consecrated
- Sebastián Ramírez de Fuenleal (1527–1538), Appointed, Bishop of Tui

Metropolitan Archbishops of Santo Domingo

Elevated February 12, 1546

- Alfonso de Fuenmayor (1538–1554), Died, first archbishop as of 11 February 1546.
- Diego de Covarrubias y Leiva (1556–1560), Appointed, Archbishop (Personal Title) of Ciudad Rodrigo.
- Juan Salcedo (1562–1566) Died
- Juan Alzóloras (Arzolaras) (1566–1568), Appointed, Archbishop (Personal Title) of Islas Canarias
- Francisco Andrés de Carvajal (1570–1577) Died
- Alfonso López de Avila (1580–1591), Appointed, Archbishop of Santafé en Nueva Granada
- Nicolás de Ramos y Santos (1592–1599) Died
- Agustín Dávila Padilla (1599–1604) Died
- Domingo Valderrama y Centeno (1606–1608), Appointed, Archbishop (Personal Title) of La Paz)
- Cristóbal Rodríguez Juárez (1608–1613), Appointed, Archbishop (Personal Title) of Arequipa
- Diego de Contreras (1612–1618) Died)
- Pedro de Solier y Vargas (1619–1620) Died
- Pedro de Oviedo Falconi (1621–1628), Confirmed, Archbishop (Personal Title) of Quito
- Fernando de Vera y Zuñiga (1628–1629), Confirmed, Archbishop (Personal Title) of Cuzco
- Bernardino de Almansa Carrión (1629–1631), Confirmed, Archbishop of Santafé en Nueva Granada
- Facundo de la Torre (1632–1640) Died
- Diego de Guevara y Estrada (1640–1642) Died
- Maestro Valderas (1647–1648) Resigned
- Francisco Pio Guadalupe Téllez (1648–1660) Died)
- Francisco de la Cueva Maldonado (1662–1667) Died
- Juan de Escalante Turcios y Mendoza (1673–1677) Confirmed, Archbishop (Personal Title) of Yucatán
- Domingo Fernández Navarrete (1682–1686)
- Fernando de Carvajal y Ribera (1687–1700) Resigned)
- Francisco del Rincón (1705–1714), Appointed, Archbishop (Personal Title) of Caracas, Santiago de Venezuela
- Antonio Claudio Alvarez de Quiñones (1717–1725), Appointed, Archbishop of Santafé en Nueva Granada
- Francisco Mendigaño Armendáriz (1726–1728) Died
- Juan de Galabis (1729–1738), Confirmed, Archbishop of Santafé en Nueva Granada
- Domingo Pantaleón Álvarez de Abreu (1738–1743), Confirmed, Archbishop (Personal Title) of Tlaxcala (Puebla de los Angeles)
- Ignacio Padilla Estrada (1743–1753), Confirmed, Archbishop (Personal Title) of Yucatán
- José Moreno Curiel (1753–1755) Died
- Felipe Ruiz Ausmendi (1757–1768) Died
- Isidro Rodríguez Lorenzo (1767–1788) Retired
- Fernando del Portillo y Torres (1788–1798) Appointed, Archbishop of Santafé en Nueva Granada
- Pedro Valera y Jiménez (1814–1833) Died
- Tomás de Portes e Infante (1848–1858)
- Bienvenudo Monzon y Martin (1862–1866) Died
- Fernando Antonio Arturo de Merino y Ramírez (1885–1906) Died
- Adolfo Alejandro Nouel y Boba-Dilla (1906–1935) Resigned
- Ricardo Pittini (1935–1961) Died
- Octavio Antonio Beras Rojas (1961–1981) (Cardinal in 1976) Retired
- Nicolás de Jesús López Rodríguez (1981–2016) (Cardinal in 1991) Retired
- Francisco Ozoria Acosta (2016–2026) Retired
- Carlos Tomás Morel Diplán (2026–present)

=== Coadjutor archbishops ===
- Elías Rodríguez Ortiz (1857); did not succeed to the see
- Adolfo Alejandro Nouel y Bobadilla (1904–1906)
- Luis Antonio de Mena y Steinkoft (1922–1932); did not succeed to the see
- Octavio Antonio Beras Rojas (1945–1961); future Cardinal
- Hugo Eduardo Polanco Brito (1970–1975); did not succeed to the see; appointed Archbishop (Personal Title) of Nuestra Señora de la Altagracia en Higüey

=== Auxiliary bishops ===
- Felipe Antonio Gallego Gorgojo (1945–1951)
- Príamo Pericles Tejeda Rosario (1975–1986), appointed Bishop of Baní
- Juan Félix Pepén y Soliman (1975–1995)
- Ramón Benito de La Rosa y Carpio (1988–1995), appointed Bishop of Nuestra Señora de la Altagracia en Higüey
- Francisco José Arnáiz Zarandona (1988–2002)
- Pablo Cedano Cedano (1996–2013)
- Amancio Escapa Aparici (1996–2016)
- Pablo Cedano Cedano (1996–2018)
- Victor Emilio Masalles Pere (2010–2016), appointed Bishop of Baní
- Ramón Benito Ángeles Fernández (2017–2024)
- Jesús Castro Marte (2017–2020), appointed Bishop of Nuestra Señora de la Altagracia en Higüey
- Faustino Burgos Brisman (2017–present)
- José Amable Durán Tineo (2020–present)

== See also ==
- List of Catholic dioceses in the Dominican Republic
- Timeline of Santo Domingo

== Sources and external links ==
- GCatholic, with Google map - data for all sections
- "Archdiocese of Santo Domingo". Catholic-Hierarchy.
