= Religion in Latin America =

Religion in Latin America (Latinobarómetro 2024)
1. Catholic (54%)
2. Protestant (19%)
3. Unaffiliated (19%)
4. Other (8%)

Religion in Latin America is characterized by the historical predominance of Catholicism, and growing number and influence of Protestants and irreligious people. According to Latinobarómetro in 2024, 54% of the population is Catholic, 19% is evangelical and 19% is not religiously affiliated.

== Christianity ==
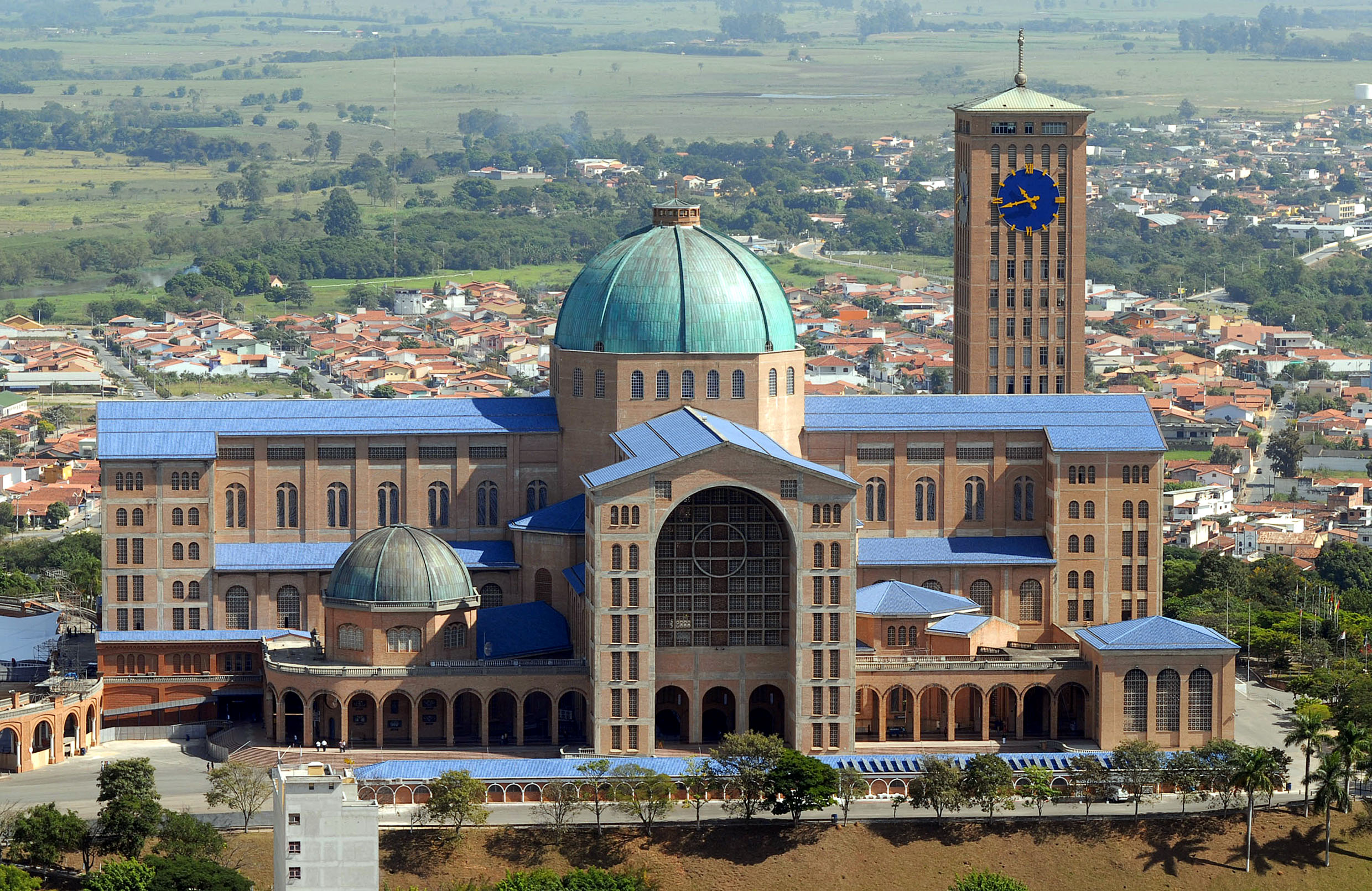
The Basilica of the National Shrine of Our Lady of Aparecida in Brazil is the second largest in the world, after only of the Basilica of Saint Peter in Vatican City.

The majority of Latin Americans are Christians (90%), mostly Roman Catholics. Membership in Protestant denominations is increasing, particularly in Brazil, Honduras, Guatemala, Nicaragua, El Salvador and Puerto Rico. In particular, Pentecostalism has experienced massive growth. This movement is increasingly attracting Latin America's middle classes. Anglicanism also has a long and growing presence in Latin America.

According to the detailed Pew Research Center multi-country survey in 2014, 69% of the Latin American population is Catholic and 19% is Protestant, rising to 22% in Brazil and over 40% in much of Central America. More than half of these are converts. According to the 2014 Pew survey, the 46 countries and territories of Latin America and the Caribbean comprised, in absolute terms, the world's second-largest Christian population (24%; including U.S., British, Dutch and French territories), after the 50 countries and territories of Europe (26%; including Russia, excluding Turkey), but just before the 51 countries and territories of Sub-Saharan Africa (24%; including Mauritania, excluding Sudan). A 2024 survey by M&R Consultadores found that 36.2% of Latin Americans identified as Catholic, 31% as Nondenominational believers and 27.7% as Protestant.

=== Arrival of Christianity ===
Christianity is one of the main religions in Latin America today, but it has not always been like that. Christianity was an idea that Spanish conquistadors brought with them when they came to the New World and something that they attempted to spread once they got there. Converting the native people of the Americas was one of the main objectives of the Spanish conquest of the Americas. Funded by papal grants, Spanish monarchs and conquistadors were incentivized to convert the people of the Americas to Christianity. This conversion of the natives allowed the Spaniards to claim the New World as theirs as they were spreading the word, and it also served to unify the new lands. This conversion and spread of Christianity is called evangelization, and the clergy felt it was their duty to carry out this task.

=== The Spread ===
Within this spread, different religious orders took different approaches toward converting the natives. The first of these were the Franciscans. The Fransiciancs believed that emulating Christ would cause the natives to be drawn to Christianity. They relied on the “pursuit of apostolic poverty and charity” and hoped that emulating Christ in their actions would draw the natives towards the religion. The Franciscans also had a slightly different outlook on why conversion was necessary. They believed that the end times would come once Christianity had been spread to all corners of the world. Because of this, they rushed through their conversion and focused more on trying to baptize as many people as possible than making sure that the natives had a deep understanding of the Christian faith. The Dominicans had a very different outlook on conversion. They believed that the people needed to have a deep connection with God before they could be baptized, so they spent more time at each location, making sure that the natives fully understood the word before baptizing them and moving on to the next area. Not only did they have a different outlook on conversion themselves, but also the Natives as people. While the rest of the Spanish world saw them as savages, the Dominicans recognized that they were people and that the Spaniards were no better than them. The Spaniards also sinned against their God, so in the Dominicans’ minds, this made them no different than the natives. They were also the ones who saw the effects of the natives' culture on their conversion, and this was also part of why they spent time at each location, ensuring they did not blend the two religions together. These are just two of the many different religious orders that attempted to convert the Americas to Christianity. While each group had slightly different ways of converting the natives, these two orders give the two overarching ideals behind conversing: slow and focusing on understanding or fast and concentrating on the number of conversions.

=== Challenges with the Spread of Christianity ===
While each religious group went about conversion slightly differently, every group faced a similar set of problems. These challenges came in the form of cultural and language barriers. These differences came to a head in a coloquio in 1524. Here, religious leaders from both sides came together and expressed their views on the religious transformation. The Spaniards voiced their views on how the conversion should go, and the natives shared their fears about it. According to one of the Mexican lords, the natives were not opposed to the idea of a new religion or learning aspects of it, but he warned of trying to do too much and to avoid angering the natives' gods. He told them to proceed slowly with great deliberation if they were to continue their conversion. The language barrier was one of the biggest challenges the Spaniards had to overcome. The natives had hundreds of different languages, making it nearly impossible for missionaries to share the word with the different groups. To fix this, missionaries convert parts of the Bible into Nahuatl. This was the lingua franca, the language of government and trade, of most of Mexico and parts of Central America, and it gave them the best way to reach as many people as possible with the least amount of work. The other challenge they faced was cultural. With the natives having such a long and deep history and culture before the Spaniards got there, it was hard to convince them to give up the religion they had been practicing for centuries. This eventually led to a distorted conversion. The natives blended the two religions together and created a hybrid, some of which is still practiced today in Mexico. This blended nature of religion and the adoption of a new religion into old practices is called transculturation. This was especially prevalent in Mexico and their god, Texcatlipoca. Due to the speed at which most areas of Mexico were converted, there were gaps in their knowledge. Because of this, they associated characteristics of their god with the Christian God. While initially missionaries thought this was a good sign and the natives were learning, it led to a distorted view of Christianity where they agreed with certain beliefs and incorporated them into their pre-existing religion. While there was some success with conversion, natives would often reject the ideals altogether or find ways to bend them to fit their old religion. If neither of these things worked, then many would just run away, either to find a new home or back to their old home they had before the Spanish came. This, however, was not all bad. Missionaries could use their love for festivals and rituals to entice people to worship God. It allowed them to blend what they knew the natives liked with what they tried to teach them. This process led to many natives accepting aspects of Christianity, known as syncretism. Syncretism was the blend of both old and new. It was applying the basics they had learned from the missionaries and combining them with their religious customs to make their hybrid religions. Part of the reason for this pushback against the Christian religion was caused by the Spanish. The way they conquered the lands of the Americas and then forced the natives to learn Christianity created the image of a “conquering God” rather than a God of love and peace. This contrasting image caused many to become confused by the differing images the missionaries were portraying and caused the natives to push back against the conversion.

== Indigenous and Afro-Latin creeds ==
Indigenous creeds and rituals are still practiced in countries with large percentages of Amerindians, such as Bolivia, Guatemala, Mexico, and Peru. Various Afro-Latin American traditions such as Santería, Candomblé, Umbanda, and Macumba are also practiced, mainly in Cuba and Brazil.

== Other world religions ==
Argentina hosts the largest communities of both Jews (180,000-300,000) and Muslims (500,000-600,000) in Latin America. Brazil is the country with more practitioners in the world of Allan Kardec's Spiritism. Practitioners of Judaism, Mormonism, Jehovah's Witnesses, Buddhism, Islam, Hinduism, Bahá'í Faith, and Shinto are also present in Latin America.

== Statistics ==
=== CID-Gallup 2010 ===
Religion in Latin America (2010)
Country	Christian (%)	Catholic (%)	Protestant (%)	Other religions (%)	Unaffiliated (%)
Argentina	85,5	74,7	10,8	3,5	11,0
Bolivia	94,4	76,0	18,4	2,5	3,1
Brazil	88,7	64,6	24,1	4,3	8,0
Chile	82,1	66,2	15,9	2,5	15,4
Colombia	94,7	81,7	13,0	2,3	3,0
Costa Rica	89,9	70,7	19,2	4,0	6,1
Cuba	50,1	45,8	4,3	7,2	42,7
Dominican Republic	90,2	68,9	21,3	4,0	5,8
Ecuador	93,1	80,9	12,2	2,3	4,6
El Salvador	81,8	51,7	30,1	2,2	16,0
Guatemala	86,8	47,1	39,7	1,7	11,5
Honduras	88,8	49,8	39,0	3,2	8,0
Mexico	92,0	82,9	9,1	3,4	4,6
Nicaragua	83,5	54,4	29,1	3,8	12,7
Panama	92,7	76,0	16,7	3,3	4,0
Paraguay	96,1	88,2	7,9	2,3	1,6
Peru	93,6	80,6	13,0	3,0	3,4
Puerto Rico (Note: Note: Puerto Rico is a territory of the United States.)	92,2	61,5	30,7	1,4	6,4
Uruguay	52,4	42,8	9,6	4,6	43,0
Venezuela	91,4	75,8	15,6	3,3	5,3

=== 2014 Pew Research Center data ===
Religion in Latin America (2014)
Country	Catholic (%)	Protestant (%)	Unaffiliated (%)	Other (%)
Paraguay	89	7	1	2
Mexico	81	9	7	4
Colombia	79	13	6	2
Ecuador	79	13	5	3
Bolivia	77	16	4	3
Peru	76	17	4	3
Venezuela	73	17	7	4
Argentina	71	15	12	3
Panama	70	19	7	4
Chile	64	17	16	3
Costa Rica	62	25	9	4
Brazil	61	26	8	5
Dominican Republic	57	23	18	2
Puerto Rico (Note: Note: Puerto Rico is a territory of the United States.)	56	33	8	2
El Salvador	50	36	12	3
Guatemala	50	41	6	3
Nicaragua	50	40	7	4
Honduras	46	41	10	2
Uruguay	42	15	37	6
Latin America	69	19	8	4

=== Number of followers by country (2015 Pew Research Center projections for 2020) ===
Caption textNumber of followers by country (2015 Pew Research Center projections for 2020)
Countries	Population Total	Christians %	Christian Population	Unaffiliated %	Unaffiliated Population	Other religions %	Other religions Population
Argentina	44,830,000	85.4%	38,420,000	12.1%	5,320,000	2.5%	1,090,000
Bolivia	11,830,000	94%	11,120,000	4.1%	480,000	1.9%	230,000
Brazil	210,450,000	88.1%	185,430,000	8.4%	17,620,000	3.5%	7,400,000
Chile	18,540,000	88.3%	16,380,000	9.7%	1,800,000	2%	360,000
Colombia	52,160,000	92.3%	48,150,000	6.7%	3,510,000	1%	500,000
Costa Rica	5,270,000	90.8%	4,780,000	8%	420,000	1.2%	70,000
Cuba	11,230,000	58.9%	6,610,000	23.2%	2,600,000	17.9%	2,020,000
Dominican Republic	11,280,000	88%	9,930,000	10.9%	1,230,000	1.1%	120,000
Ecuador	16,480,000	94%	15,490,000	5.6%	920,000	0.4%	70,000
El Salvador	6,670,000	88%	5,870,000	11.2%	740,000	0.8%	60,000
Guatemala	18,210,000	95.3%	17,360,000	3.9%	720,000	0.8%	130,000
Honduras	9,090,000	87.5%	7,950,000	10.5%	950,000	2%	190,000
Mexico	126,010,000	94.1%	118,570,000	5.7%	7,240,000	0.2%	200,000
Nicaragua	6,690,000	85.3%	5,710,000	13%	870,000	1.7%	110,000
Panama	4,020,000	92.7%	3,720,000	5%	200,000	2.3%	100,000
Paraguay	7,630,000	96.9%	7,390,000	1.1%	90,000	2%	150,000
Peru	32,920,000	95.4%	31,420,000	3.1%	1,010,000	1.5%	490,000
Uruguay	3,490,000	57%	1,990,000	41.5%	1,450,000	1.5%	50,000
Venezuela	33,010,000	89.5%	29,540,000	9.7%	3,220,000	0.8%	250,000
Latin America	653,390,000	89.7%	585,850,000	8%	52,430,000	2.3%	15,110,000

=== Latinobarómetro 2024 ===
Religion in Latin America (2024)
Country	Catholic (%)	Protestant (%)	Unaffiliated (%)
Paraguay	72	7	0
Mexico	72	5	15
Colombia	57	15	20
Ecuador	65	19	13
Bolivia	63	20	9
Peru	64	21	9
Venezuela	72	8	14
Argentina	63	9	25
Panama	52	29	11
Chile	45	17	37
Costa Rica	52	25	18
Brazil	46	28	17
Dominican Republic	43	28	25
El Salvador	40	35	21
Guatemala	39	40	18
Honduras	36	43	19
Uruguay	33	6	52
Latin America	54	19	19

Nicaragua was absent from the survey.

== See also ==
- Religion in Argentina
- Religion in Bolivia
- Religion in Brazil
- Religion in Chile
- Religion in Colombia
- Religion in Costa Rica
- Religion in Cuba
- Religion in the Dominican Republic
- Religion in Ecuador
- Religion in El Salvador
- Religion in Guatemala
- Religion in Honduras
- Religion in Mexico
- Religion in Nicaragua
- Religion in Panama
- Religion in Paraguay
- Religion in Peru
- Religion in Puerto Rico
- Religion in Uruguay
- Religion in Venezuela
- Irreligion in Latin America
- Latin American Muslims
- Latin American Jews
