= Miss Universe Dominicana 2000 =

2000 paegant in the Dominican Republic

- Date: March 25, 2000
- Venue: Renaissance Auditorio de Festival del Hotel Jaragua, Santo Domingo, Dominican Republic
- Broadcaster: Telemicro
- Entrants: 54
- Winner: Gilda Jovine; Constanza

Miss Universe Dominicana 2000 was held on March 25, 2000. There were 54 candidates, representing provinces and municipalities, who entered. The winner would represent the Dominican Republic at Miss Universe 2000. The Miss Mundo Dominicana would enter Miss World 2000. The Miss Internacional Dominicana would enter in Miss International 2000. The first runner-up would enter in Miss Tropical International 2000. The second runner-up would enter in Reinado Internacional del Café 2000. The rest of finalists entered different pageants. This edition would be the last edition to select Top 20 quarter finalist in the history of Miss Dominican Republic.

== Results ==
Final results	Contestant
Miss Universe Dominicana 2000	Constanza - Gilda Jovine
Miss Mundo Dominicana	Distrito Nacional - Claudia Santaella
Miss Internacional Dominicana	Samaná - Daniela Andrade
1st Runner-up	Cotuí - Arianna Campusano
2nd Runner-up	Com. Dom. Orlando - Oscarina Crisóstomo
Semi-finalists	Villa Tapia - Cristina Cruz; Santiago Rodríguez - Yady Rosado; Santiago - Yaira Abreu; Puerto Plata - Marlene Burgos; Monte Cristi - Silvana Santos
Quarter-finalists	Boca Chica - Vicky Reyes; Imbert - Suly de la Mota; Consuelo - Carolina Oviedo; Villa Altagracia - Marilyn Mena; Castíllo - Tania Lara; Nagua - Landy Hernández; El Seibo - Raiza Colmenares; Pimentel - Eva Ynoa; Dajabón - Odette Carillo; San Juan - Reimy Solano

== Delegates ==
Represented	Contestant	Age	Height	Hometown
Azua	Clarisa de Lara Merán	20	1.67 m (5 ft 5 3/4 in)	Santo Domingo
Baní	Airiz Mella Escandón	22	1.74 m (5 ft 8 1/2 in)	Baní
Barahona	Anna María Torres Bosch	19	1.70 m (5 ft 7 in)	Santo Domingo
Boca Chica	Victoria María Reyes Báez	18	1.74 m (5 ft 8 1/2 in)	Santo Domingo
Bonao	Mariely Bisonó Moncada	23	1.77 m (5 ft 9 3/4 in)	Bonao
Castíllo	Tania Lara Medina	25	1.72 m (5 ft 7 3/4 in)	San Francisco de Macorís
Com. Dominicana En Nueva York	Lariela Rodríguez Landro	19	1.75 m (5 ft 9 in)	Brooklyn
Com. Dominicana En Orlando	Oscarina Crisóstomo de la Rosa	22	1.82 m (5 ft 11 3/4 in)	Orlando
Constanza	Gilda Evangelina Jovine Gross	19	1.81 m (5 ft 11 1/4 in)	Santo Domingo
Consuelo	Carolina Oviedo Albuquerque	21	1.79 m (5 ft 10 1/2 in)	Santo Domingo
Cotuí	Arianna Campusano Reyonsa	20	1.80 m (5 ft 10 3/4 in)	Santiago de los Caballeros
Dajabón	Odette Carillo López	24	1.69 m (5 ft 6 1/2 in)	Santiago de los Caballeros
Distrito Nacional	Claudia Santaella Quiñónez	19	1.77 m (5 ft 9 3/4 in)	Santo Domingo
Duarte	Clary Karina Tineo García	19	1.74 m (5 ft 8 1/2 in)	San Francisco de Macorís
Duvergé	Viviana Sánchez Polanco	26	1.71 m (5 ft 7 1/4 in)	Santiago de los Caballeros
El Seibo	Raiza Colmenares Valencia	18	1.80 m (5 ft 10 3/4 in)	Santiago de los Caballeros
Elías Piña	Alecia Moreno Taradeos	20	1.73 m (5 ft 8 in)	Santo Domingo
Espaillat	Paola Gutiérrez de Camacho	24	1.70 m (5 ft 7 in)	Moca
Guaymate	Samantha Cáceres de los Santos	19	1.73 m (5 ft 8 in)	Villa Hermosa
Hato Mayor	Eugenia Vallamón Rosario	18	1.78 m (5 ft 10 in)	Santiago de los Caballeros
Imbert	Suly Marleny de la Mota Rosario	18	1.72 m (5 ft 7 3/4 in)	Imbert
Jánico	Andrea Peña de los Santos	21	1.79 m (5 ft 10 1/2 in)	Santiago de los Caballeros
Jarabacoa	Mónica del Carmen Abreu Matos	25	1.77 m (5 ft 9 3/4 in)	Jarabacoa
Jimaní	Carolina Gómez Pichardo	24	1.69 m (5 ft 6 1/2 in)	Bonao
La Altagracia	Laurette García Rodríguez	18	1.71 m (5 ft 7 1/4 in)	La Romana
La Romana	Teresa Fernández Inoa	22	1.75 m (5 ft 9 in)	La Romana
La Vega	Nathaly Durán Escamoso	21	1.74 m (5 ft 8 1/2 in)	Santiago de los Caballeros
Licey al Medio	Jeudy María Melo Espinal	23	1.81 m (5 ft 11 1/4 in)	Santiago de los Caballeros
Los Alcarrizos	Alma Santana Reyes	19	1.80 m (5 ft 10 3/4 in)	Santo Domingo
Monción	Yaneida Elizabeth Polanco Brito	21	1.69 m (5 ft 6 1/2 in)	Santiago de los Caballeros
Monte Cristi	Silvana Andreina Santos Mateo	22	1.83 m (6 ft 0 in)	Santo Domingo
Monte Plata	Yailitza Sarita Palacios	19	1.75 m (5 ft 9 in)	Santo Domingo
Nagua	Landy Hernández Bautista	20	1.80 m (5 ft 10 3/4 in)	Nagua
Neiba	Laura Fermín Castañeda	25	1.70 m (5 ft 7 in)	Baní
Pedernales	Ana María Veaux Rojas	24	1.75 m (5 ft 9 in)	Santo Domingo
Pedro Brand	Carina Pérez Polanco	20	1.79 m (5 ft 10 1/2 in)	Santo Domingo
Piedra Blanca	Mía Tatiana Sued Alcántara	21	1.70 m (5 ft 7 in)	Santo Domingo
Pimentel	Eva María Ynoa Tavares	20	1.74 m (5 ft 8 1/2 in)	San Francisco de Macorís
Puerto Plata	Marlene Raydirys Burgos Mota	23	1.84 m (6 ft 1/2 in)	San Felipe de Puerto Plata
Salcedo	Mayline Rosario Veras	23	1.81 m (5 ft 11 1/4 in)	Salcedo
Samaná	Daniela Andrade Espaillat	18	1.85 m (6 ft 3/4 in)	Las Terrenas
San Cristóbal	Sarah Carolina Medina de la Rosa	21	1.83 m (6 ft 0 in)	San Cristóbal
San Francisco de Macorís	Dulce Esperanza Tavarez Ynoa	22	1.74 m (5 ft 8 1/2 in)	San Francisco de Macorís
San Juan	Reimy Solano Torres	18	1.67 m (5 ft 5 3/4 in)	Santiago de los Caballeros
San Pedro de Macorís	Arianna María Sosa Pineda	20	1.72 m (5 ft 7 3/4 in)	Santo Domingo
Santiago	Yaira María Abreu González	18	1.76 m (5 ft 9 1/4 in)	Santiago de los Caballeros
Santiago Rodríguez	Yady Josefina Rosado Oviedo	18	1.79 m (5 ft 10 1/2 in)	Santiago de los Caballeros
Santo Domingo de Guzmán	Olivia del Carmen Arredondo Cid	21	1.83 m (6 ft 0 in)	Santo Domingo
Sosúa	Alba Ynoa Medina	25	1.71 m (5 ft 7 1/4 in)	Sosúa
Valverde	Paula Roman Celis	24	1.74 m (5 ft 8 1/2 in)	Santo Domingo
Villa Altagracia	Marilyn Mena Mejía	20	1.77 m (5 ft 9 3/4 in)	Santo Domingo
Villa Bisonó	Antonieta Reyes Estevez	24	1.73 m (5 ft 8 in)	Santiago de los Caballeros
Villa González	Araiza Peña Montesdeoca	19	1.75 m (5 ft 9 in)	Santiago de los Caballeros
Villa Tapia	Cristina Miverva Cruz Mirabal	22	1.72 m (5 ft 7 3/4 in)	Santo Domingo
