= Yuna River =

Yuna River Río Yuna
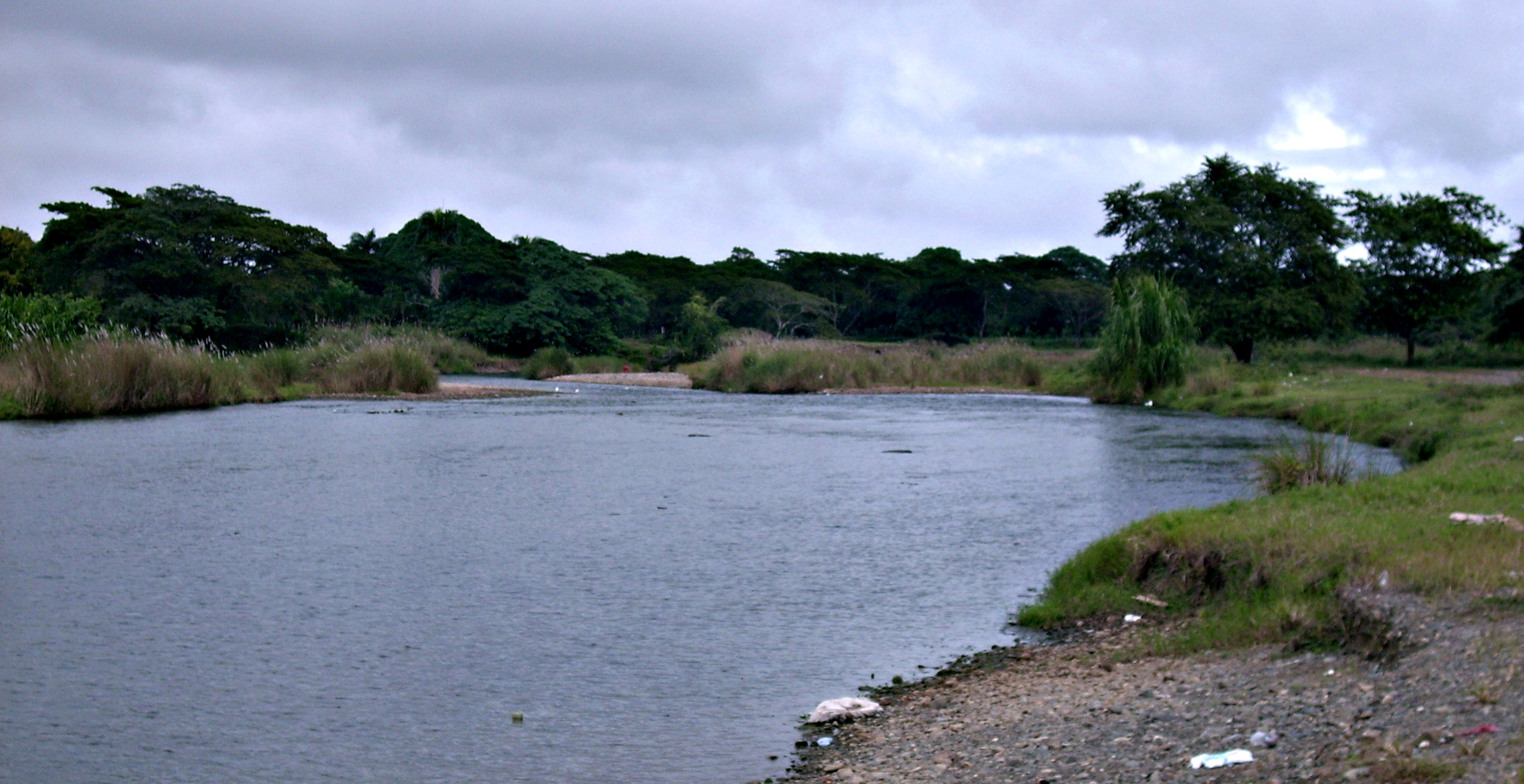

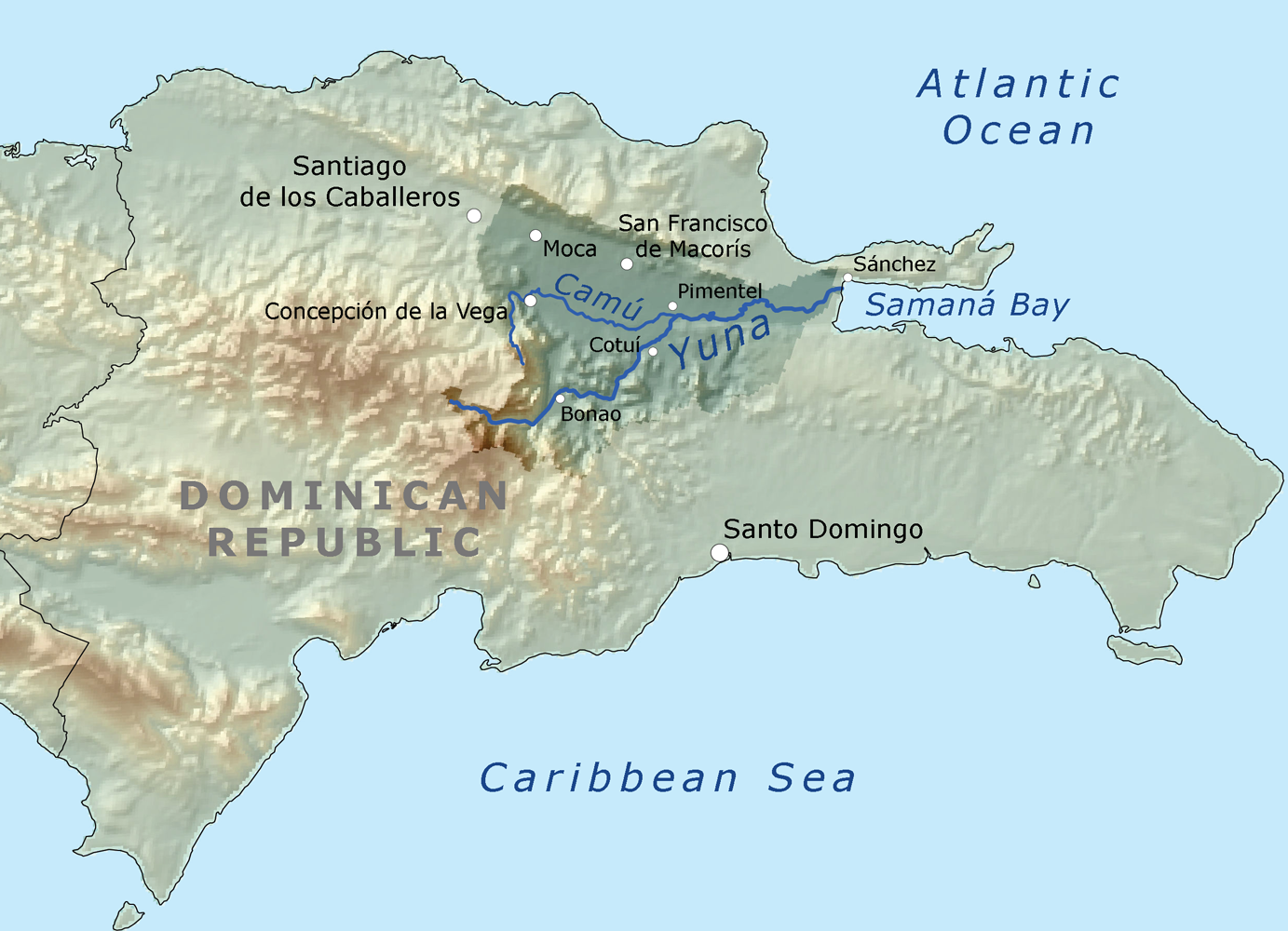
- Map showing the Yuna drainage basin

Location
- Country: Dominican Republic
- Provinces: Monseñor Nouel, Sánchez Ramírez, Duarte, Samaná
- Cities: Bonao, Cotuí

Physical characteristics
- Source: Cerro Montoso Hill
  - location: La Cuesta de la Vaca, Bonao, Monseñor Nouel, Dominican Republic
  - coordinates: 18°47′16″N 70°25′05″W
  - elevation: 1,075 m (3,527 ft)
- Mouth: Samaná Bay
  - location: Los Haitises National Park, Sánchez, Samaná, Dominican Republic
  - coordinates: 19°11′47″N 69°37′24″W
  - elevation: 0 m (0 ft)
- Length: 185.17 km (115.06 mi)
- Basin size: 5,498 km^{2} (2,123 sq mi)

Basin features
- Tributaries
  - left: Tireo River, Masipedro River, Yujo River, Camú River, Cuaba River, Nigua River, Yaiba River, Baiguate River, Azucey River, Guayabo River
  - right: Yuboa River, Maimón River, Maguaca River, Chacuey River, Payabo River

The Yuna River (Spanish: Río Yuna) is the second longest river in the Dominican Republic, stretching for a length of 185.17 km (115.06 miles). It forms within the Cordillera Central mountain range southwest of the city of Bonao in Monseñor Nouel Province, and passes through the fertile Cibao Valley. As the river courses north-northeast, it passes through the city of Bonao. Southwest of Cotuí, the river reaches Hatillo Dam (Spanish: Presa de Hatillo) before turning northeast then east as it reaches its mouth at the Samaná Bay in the northeast part of the Dominican Republic. Like many rivers in the Dominican Republic, the name is derived from the Taíno language.

== Course ==
The source of the Yuna is located 78.95 km (49.06 miles) southeast of the city of Santiago and 62.41 km (38.78 miles) northwest of the city of Santo Domingo. The source is located near the southern Monseñor Nouel village of La Cuesta de la Vaca within the municipality of Bonao on Cerro Montoso Hill (Spanish: Loma de Cerro Montoso) at an elevation of 1,075 m (3,527 feet) above sea level. The Cerro Montoso Hill lies along the highest mountain range in the West Indies, the Cordillera Central. The Cordillera Central provides the principal watershed and drainage divide for the Dominican Republic; the Yuna has its source along the northern slope of the mountain range. The Yuna descends from its headwaters running south then west where several streams feed into the river near the San José de Ocoa province border. The Yuna then turns north near the village of El Torito passing through several mountains including Torito Hill (Spanish: La Loma del Torito), and Middle Hill (Spanish: La Loma El Medio). The Yuna shifts north-northwest near the Middle Hill passing through several villages including Pino de Yuna, Piedra de los Veganos, and El Capa.

The Yuna next flows into the village of Los Finitos where it travels in a more northerly course. The river then receives two tributaries along its left bank: the Blanco and Tireo River. The Yuna then heads northeast into lower elevations as the river leaves the Cordillera Central. The river passes through the village of Los Quemados, receiving several forks that originate within the Cordillera Central to the west. The river next bypasses Bonao to the northwest of the city. The Yuna then flows into the town of Los Arroces, receiving a major tributary, the Masopedro River, on the left bank. The Yuna then heads east passing under the Autopista Duarte before entering another mountainous region of Monseñor Nouel. The Yuna next passes north of Falconbridge Ltd., a major economic income for the Bonao area. The Yuna heads east as it cuts through several mountains in this region including the Flat Hill (Spanish: La Loma del Llano) where the Yujo River converges onto the Yuna. The river accompanies the Sánchez Ramírez Province line east of Flat Hill and enters the province upon arriving at Lake Hatillo (Spanish: Presa de Hatillo) in the municipality of Cotuí where it joins the Maimón River.

Lake Hatillo runs north-northeast for 15.46 km (9.61 miles) and has a total area of 27.94 km^{2} (11 square miles) from the Yuna–Maimón convergence to a hydroelectric dam located 4.21 km (2.62 miles) southwest of Cotuí. The reservoir, surrounded by rolling hills, is the largest artificial lake and is home to the largest dam in the Caribbean. The Hatillo dam in the Yuna River is an example of a dam with flood control purposes. The Yuna continues past the dam running northeast while decreasing in elevation and receiving first the Maguaca River and later the Chacuey River along the right bank. The Yuna bypasses the city of Cotuí to the north and enters a Sánchez Ramírez region filled with cocoa orchards. The Yuna receives its principal tributary, the Camú River, approximately 11.60 km (7.21 miles) northeast of Cotuí at the Duarte Province line at an elevation of 30 m (98.43 feet) above sea level. The Camú River has its source within the Cordillera Central and has a watershed that spans seven provinces: La Vega, Santiago, Monseñor Nouel, Hermanas Mirabal, Sánchez Ramírez, and Duarte. The Yuna turns east after receiving the Camú River along its left bank and now serves as the Sánchez Ramírez-Duarte Province line, heading into wetlands filled with rice and cocoa cultivation. The easternmost segment of the Yuna past the mouth of the Camú River has the most s-shaped curves of any segment in its course. The Yuna continues to decrease in elevation as it heads east reaching 24 m (78.74 feet) above sea level upon entering Duarte Province and the municipality of Eugenio Maria de Hostos where it meets two small tributaries along its left bank: the Nigua and Yaiba Rivers.

The Yuna next heads into the municipality of Villa Riva running east-northeast while descending into elevations of 20 m (65.62 feet) above sea level. The Yuna passes north of Los Haitises National Park where it meets the Cevicos River along its right bank. The Yuna then traverses a region with several lagoons and wetlands and heads north to the town of Villa Riva before turning southeast and receiving the Payabo River on its right bank. The Yuna next passes beneath Autopista Juan Pablo II upon briefly entering the municipality of Arenoso and continues east passing several small villages including Los Coles and Agua Santa del Yuna. The Yuna continues east into the village of Los Cacaos where the Yuna serves as the Duarte–Samaná Province line in a region filled with marshlands and cienegas. The Yuna next arrives at the 15.07 km (9.36 miles) long Barracote River which separates from the right bank of the Yuna. The Barracote runs southeast-east as it reaches its mouth at the Samaná Bay (Spanish: Bahía de Samaná) in the municipality of Sánchez at an elevation of 1 m (3.28 feet) above sea level. The main branch of the Yuna continues northeast receiving the Guayabo River on its left bank before traveling east into Samaná Province. The Yuna finally reaches its delta within Los Haitises National Park approximately 3.84 km (2.39 miles) south of the city of Sánchez and 10.26 km (6.38 miles) north of the Barracote River mouth. The delta is located within the Lower Yuna Mangroves (Spanish: Manglares del Bajo Yuna) and empties into the Samaná Bay., which is one of the largest estuaries in the Caribbean. There is a long period when the Yuna River provides Samana Bay with a flow of stable and low freshwater, as well as two times of the year when the Yuna River rises and provides the Bay with a flow of large freshwater. In total the Yuna River, is 208 km long.

== Rice irrigation ==
A primary use of the Yuna River, as it flows along the city of Bonao, is for rice cultivation.

As noted by Barzman and Peguero (1995) in their work 'Impacts of Altered Freshwater Flows to Estuaries: Yuna River Watershed and Samana Bay' (Jim Tobey, 2004), 'agrochemical use for rice cultivation in the Yuna watershed is contributing to loss in soil fertility and to increases in pests, weeds, and diseases. Consequently, this requires further increases in the already high use of the same agrochemicals.' (Tobey, 2004, 31)

== Geology ==
Although most of the Yuna River bed is vegetated, but there is a high amount of gravel south of Bonao.
