= Juan Nicasio =

Dominican baseball player (born 1986)

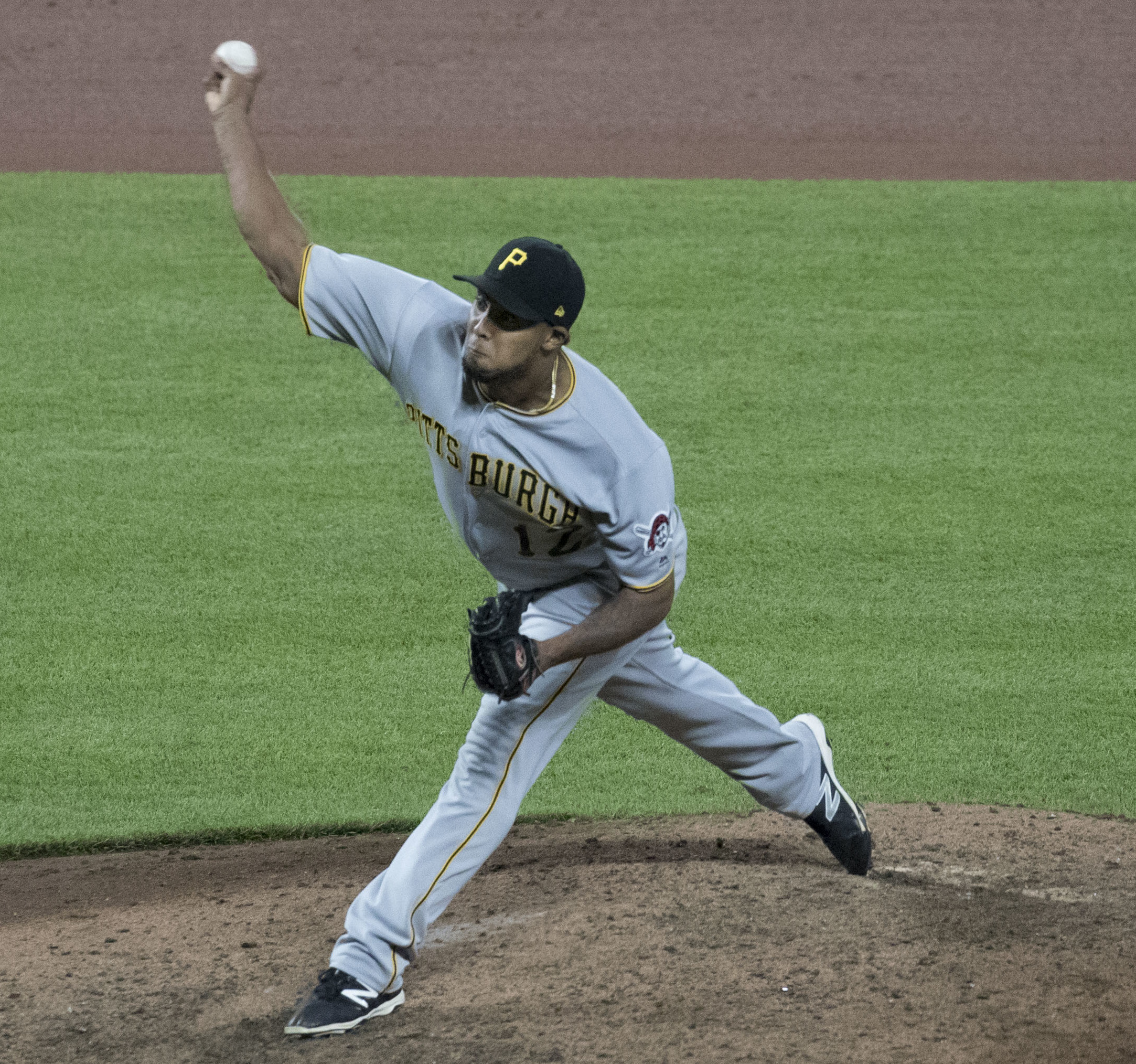
- Nicasio pitching for the Pirates in 2017
- Pitcher
- Born: August 31, 1986 (age 40); San Francisco de Macorís, Dominican Republic
- Batted: Right Threw: Right

MLB debut
- May 28, 2011, for the Colorado Rockies

Last MLB appearance
- August 17, 2020, for the Texas Rangers

MLB statistics
- Win–loss record: 40–46
- Earned run average: 4.71
- Strikeouts: 668
- Stats at Baseball Reference

Teams
- Colorado Rockies (2011–2014); Los Angeles Dodgers (2015); Pittsburgh Pirates (2016–2017); Philadelphia Phillies (2017); St. Louis Cardinals (2017); Seattle Mariners (2018); Philadelphia Phillies (2019); Texas Rangers (2020)

Juan Ramón Nicasio (born August 31, 1986) is a Dominican former professional baseball pitcher. He played in Major League Baseball (MLB) for the Colorado Rockies, Los Angeles Dodgers, Pittsburgh Pirates, St. Louis Cardinals, Seattle Mariners, Philadelphia Phillies, and Texas Rangers. Nicasio made his major league debut in 2011. In 2017, he led the National League (NL) in appearances.

== Early life ==
Nicasio was born in San Francisco de Macorís, Dominican Republic, and grew up in nearby Arenoso, where his father, Francisco, farmed coffee and rice. His mother is Aurelia Nicasio and he has one sister, Adria.

== Career ==
=== Colorado Rockies ===
==== Minor leagues ====
Nicasio signed with the Colorado Rockies at age 19, as a non-drafted free agent on August 21, 2006. In 2006, he pitched for the Dominican Summer League Rockies, going 2–1 with a 2.89 ERA in eight games (five starts), with 24 strikeouts in 28 innings. With the Rookie Casper Rockies in 2007, Nicasio went 0–3 with a 4.36 ERA in 13 games (eight starts), with 33 strikeouts in 43.1 innings.

In 2008, he pitched for the Low-A Tri-City Dust Devils and went 2–4 with a 4.50 ERA in 12 starts, with 61 strikeouts in 54 innings.

With the Single-A Asheville Tourists in 2009, he was the August 7 South Atlantic League Pitcher of the Week, and went 9–3 with a 2.41 ERA (leading the league) in 18 starts, striking out 115 batters in 112 innings of work, averaging 10.2 strikeouts per 9 innings. Baseball America named him the 16th-best Rockies prospect.

He played the 2010 season for the High-A Modesto Nuts, for whom he was the April 19, August 16, and September 6 California League Pitcher of the Week. For the season he was 12–10 with a 3.91 ERA, with 171 strikeouts (leading the league, and tops in the Rockies organization) in 177 1/3 innings pitched. His 12 wins tied for the league lead.

In 2011, pitching for the Double-A Tulsa Drillers before being called up to the major leagues, Nicasio was a mid-season Texas League All-Star, the Texas League Pitcher of the Week for May 1, and the Rockies organizational Pitcher of the Month for April. For the season he was 5–1 with a 2.22 ERA (2nd in the league), and 63 strikeouts in 56 2/3 innings, averaging 10 strikeouts per 9 innings.

==== Major leagues ====
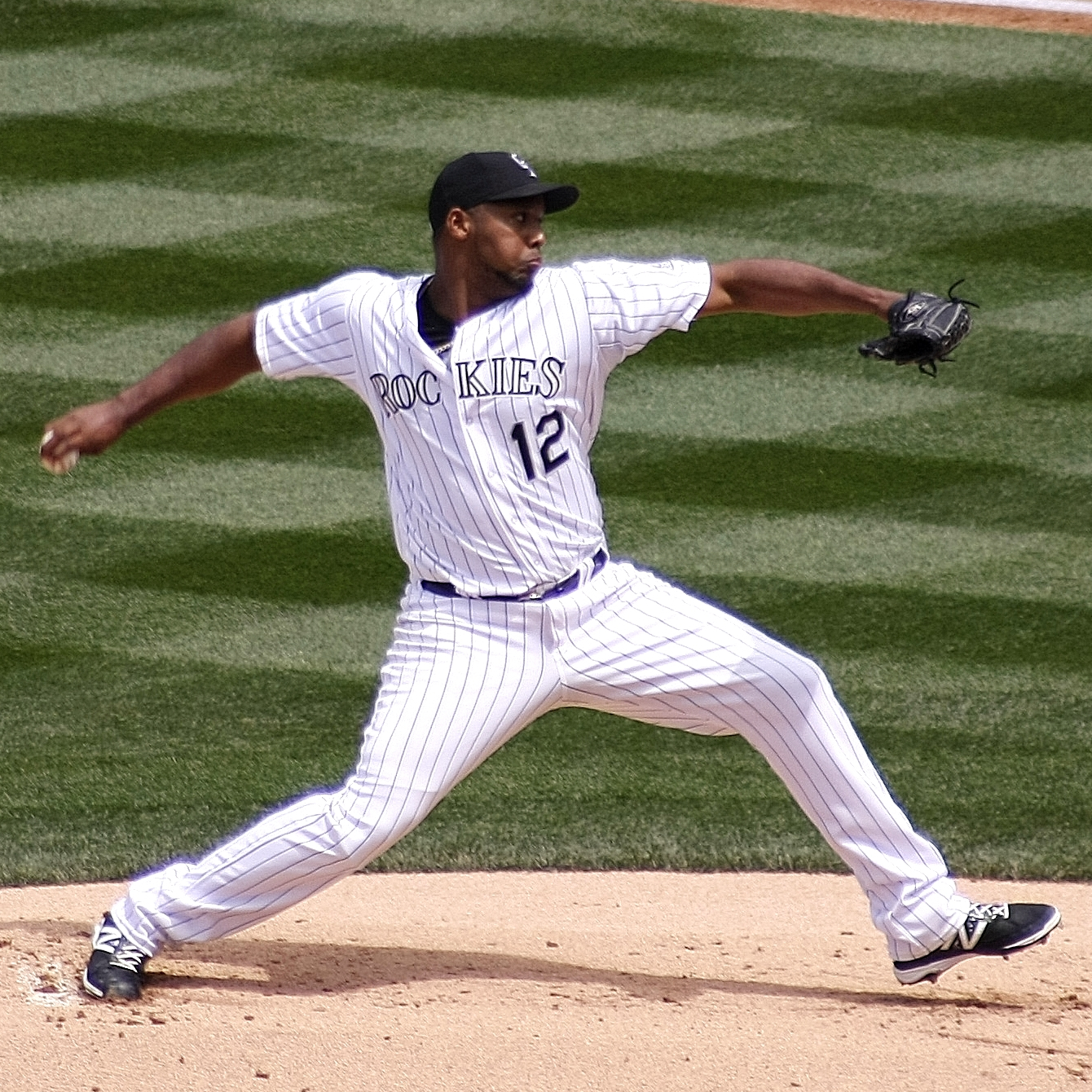
Nicasio with Colorado

On May 28, 2011, Nicasio was recalled from Double-A the Tulsa Drillers to take Jorge de la Rosa's rotation spot. Nicasio made his debut that day, facing the St. Louis Cardinals, pitching seven innings while giving up one unearned run. The Rockies won 15–4, giving Nicasio his first major league win. His first major league strikeout was of Jaime García.

On August 5, 2011, while pitching in a game against the Washington Nationals, Nicasio was struck in the head by a line drive off the bat of Nationals shortstop Ian Desmond. Nicasio lost his balance, and fractured a vertebra in his neck when he fell to the ground. During emergency surgery, doctors inserted pins into the fractured C-1 vertebra and secured a metal plate to the back of his neck. His recuperation was remarkably quick. Eleven days after the incident, he visited the dugout at Coors Field wearing a neck brace, and came out on the field to a standing ovation. He continued to improve through physical therapy, and that winter he eased back into pitching in the Dominican Republic. For the season, he was 4–4 with a 4.14 ERA, and 58 strikeouts in 71 2/3 innings.

Nicasio returned to the mound for the Rockies in April 2012 and that season he made a total of 11 appearances, with a 2–3 record and 5.28 ERA, and 54 strikeouts in 58 innings. On June 1, he injured his left knee while fielding a ground ball. After several attempts to drain the fluid in the knee failed, he underwent arthroscopic surgery in July and missed the remainder of the season.

Nicasio came back in 2013 and made 31 starts. He had a 9–9 record and 5.14 ERA, and 119 strikeouts in 157 2/3 innings.

In 2014, Nicasio appeared in 33 games (14 of them starts, and the first 19 relief appearances of his major league career). He had a 6–6 record and 5.38 ERA, and 63 strikeouts in 93 2/3 innings. He also pitched 10 games for the Triple-A Colorado Springs Sky Sox, going 3–2 with a 4.54 ERA, and one save, and 36 strikeouts in 35 2/3 innings, averaging 9.1 strikeouts per 9 innings.

On November 20, 2014, Nicasio was designated for assignment by the Rockies.

=== Los Angeles Dodgers ===
On November 24, 2014, Nicasio was traded to the Los Angeles Dodgers in exchange for a player to be named later or cash considerations. On December 16, minor league outfielder Noel Cuevas was sent to the Rockies to complete the trade. Nicasio signed a one-year, $2.3 million contract with the Dodgers on January 16, 2015, avoiding salary arbitration.

Nicasio pitched out of the bullpen for the Dodgers during the 2015 season, though he made a spot start on June 2. In 53 appearances, he was 1–3 with one save and a 3.86 ERA, and 65 strikeouts in 58 1/3 innings, averaging 10 strikeouts per 9 innings. On December 2, 2015, Nicasio was non–tendered by the Dodgers and became a free agent.

=== Pittsburgh Pirates ===
On December 10, 2015, Nicasio signed a one-year, $3 million deal with the Pittsburgh Pirates. Following a stellar 2016 spring training that saw him strike out 24 batters in 15 innings without conceding a run, as well as displaying excellent fastball velocity, Nicasio made the Pirates rotation to begin the year, beating out veteran Ryan Vogelsong. On July 4, Nicasio became only the 74th player to pitch an immaculate inning in a major-league game. For the 2016 season, he was 10–7 with a 4.50 ERA, and 138 strikeouts in 118 innings, averaging 10.5 strikeouts per 9 innings.

In 2017 with the Pirates, he was 2–5 with two saves. He had a 2.85 ERA, and 60 strikeouts in 60 innings.

=== Philadelphia Phillies ===
On August 31, 2017, Nicasio was claimed off waivers by the Philadelphia Phillies. The Phillies placed Nicasio on their Major League active roster on September 1. In two appearances for Philadelphia, he recorded one win and one strikeout across 1 1/3 scoreless innings.

=== St. Louis Cardinals ===
On September 6, 2017, the Phillies traded Nicasio to the St. Louis Cardinals in exchange for infielder Eliézer Álvarez, and for the Cardinals he was 2–0 with four saves and a 1.64 ERA and 11 strikeouts in 11 innings. In aggregate in 2017, between the Pirates, Phillies, and Cardinals he led the NL in appearances with 76, as he was 5–5 with six saves, 21 holds (tied for 9th in the league), and a 2.61 ERA, and in 72 1/3 innings he gave up 20 walks and had 72 strikeouts. He pitched on consecutive days 19 times. Nicasio averaged 2.5 walks and 9.0 strikeouts per 9 innings. He became a free agent following the season.

=== Seattle Mariners ===
On December 20, 2017, Nicasio signed a two-year contract with the Seattle Mariners. Nicasio received a $500,000 signing bonus, salaries of $7.5 million in 2018 and $9 million in 2019, and could earn an additional $3.5 million annually in performance bonuses for games finished.

In 2018, he was 1–6 with one save and a 6.00 ERA. In 42 innings, he gave up 5 walks and had 53 strikeouts. He averaged 1.1 walks and 11.4 strikeouts per 9 innings. He led all AL relievers in strikeout/walk ratio (10.60). He was on the disabled list twice in the season, once with right knee effusion and once with right knee inflammation.

=== Philadelphia Phillies (second stint) ===
On December 3, 2018, the Mariners traded Nicasio, Jean Segura, and James Pazos to the Philadelphia Phillies for Carlos Santana and J. P. Crawford.

In 2019, Nicasio was 2–3 with one save and a 4.75 ERA. In 47 1/3 innings, he gave up 21 walks and had 45 strikeouts. He averaged 4.0 walks and 8.6 strikeouts per 9 innings. His strikeout/walks ratio was 2.14. He became a free agent following the season.

=== Texas Rangers ===
On January 18, 2020, Nicasio signed a minor league deal with the Texas Rangers. Nicasio was selected to the active roster on August 14. In 2 appearances for the Rangers in 2020, Nicasio struggled to a 40.50 ERA with only one strikeout, allowing 6 runs in 1 1/3 innings of work. He became a free agent following the season.
