= Eugenio María de Hostos =

Puerto Rican writer, activist and sociologist (1839–1921)

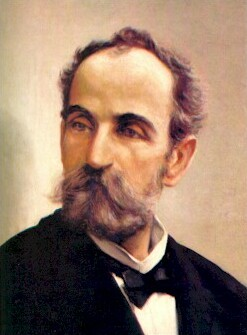
- Francisco Oller (before 1917), "Retrato de Eugenio María de Hostos"
- Born: Eugenio María de Hostos y de Bonilla; January 11, 1839; Mayagüez, Captaincy General of Puerto Rico, Spanish Empire
- Died: August 11, 1903 (aged 64); Santo Domingo, Second Dominican Republic
- Resting place: National Pantheon of the Dominican Republic
- Education: Complutense University of Madrid
- Occupations: Educator; philosopher; intellectual; lawyer; sociologist; Puerto Rican independence activist
- Spouse: Belinda Otilia de Ayala y Quintana (m. 1876)
- Children: 6, including Adolfo de Hostos
- Writing career
- Language: Spanish
- Notable works: La Peregrinación de Bayoán, 1863
- Movement: Puerto Rican independence

Eugenio María de Hostos y de Bonilla (January 11, 1839 – August 11, 1903), known as El Gran Ciudadano de las Américas ("The Great Citizen of the Americas"), was a Puerto Rican educator, philosopher, intellectual, lawyer, sociologist, novelist, and Puerto Rican independence advocate.

== Early years and family ==
Eugenio María de Hostos y de Bonilla was born on January 11, 1839, to a well-to-do family in the Barrio Río Cañas of Mayagüez, Captaincy General of Puerto Rico (present-day Puerto Rico). His parents were Eugenio María de Hostos y Rodríguez (1807–1897) and María Hilaria de Bonilla y Cintrón (died 1862, Madrid, Spain), both of Spanish descent.

At a young age, his family sent him to study in the capital of the island, San Juan, where he received his elementary education in the Liceo de San Juan. In 1852, his family sent him to Bilbao, Spain, where he graduated from the Institute of Secondary Education (high school). After he graduated, he enrolled at the Complutense University of Madrid in 1857. He studied law, philosophy and letters. As a student there, he became interested in politics. In 1863, he published in Madrid what is considered his greatest work, La Peregrinación de Bayoán. When Spain adopted its new constitution in 1869 and refused to grant Puerto Rico its independence, Hostos left Spain for the United States.

== Independence advocate ==
During his one-year stay in the United States, he joined the Cuban Revolutionary Committee and became the editor of a journal called La Revolución. Hostos believed in the creation of an Antillian Confederation (Confederación Antillana) between Puerto Rico, the Dominican Republic and Cuba. This idea was embraced by fellow Puerto Ricans Ramón Emeterio Betances and Segundo Ruiz Belvis. One of the things which disappointed Hostos was that in Puerto Rico and in Cuba there were many people who wanted their independence from Spain, but did not embrace the idea of becoming revolutionaries, preferring to be annexed by the United States.

Hostos wanted to promote the independence of Puerto Rico and Cuba and the idea of an Antillean Confederation, and he therefore traveled to many countries. Among the countries he went promoting his idea were the United States, France, Colombia, Peru, Chile, Argentina, Brazil, Venezuela, the Dominican Republic, Cuba and the Danish colony of St. Thomas, which is now part of the United States Virgin Islands.

== Educator ==
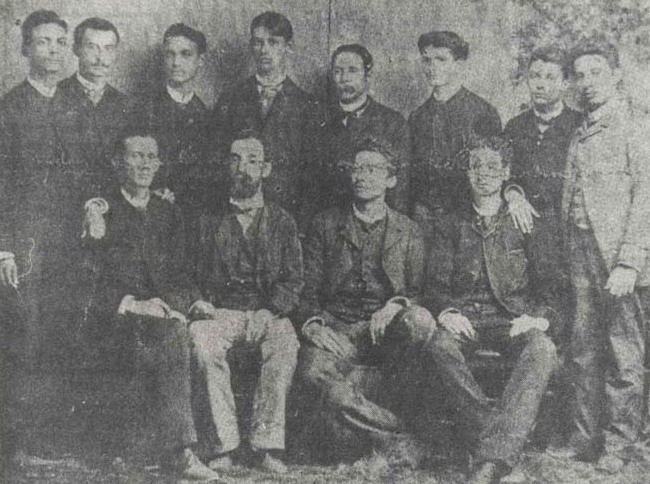
Hostos and his students at the Normal School in 1880

He spent one year in Lima, Peru, from November 1870 to December 1871, during which he helped develop the country's educational system and spoke against the harsh treatment given to the Chinese who lived there. He then moved to Chile for two years. During his stay there, he taught at the University of Chile and gave a speech titled "The Scientific Education of Women". He proposed in his speech that governments permit women in their colleges. Soon after, Chile allowed women to enter its college educational system. On September 29, 1873, he went to Argentina, where he proposed a railroad system between Argentina and Chile. His proposal was accepted and the first locomotive was named after him.

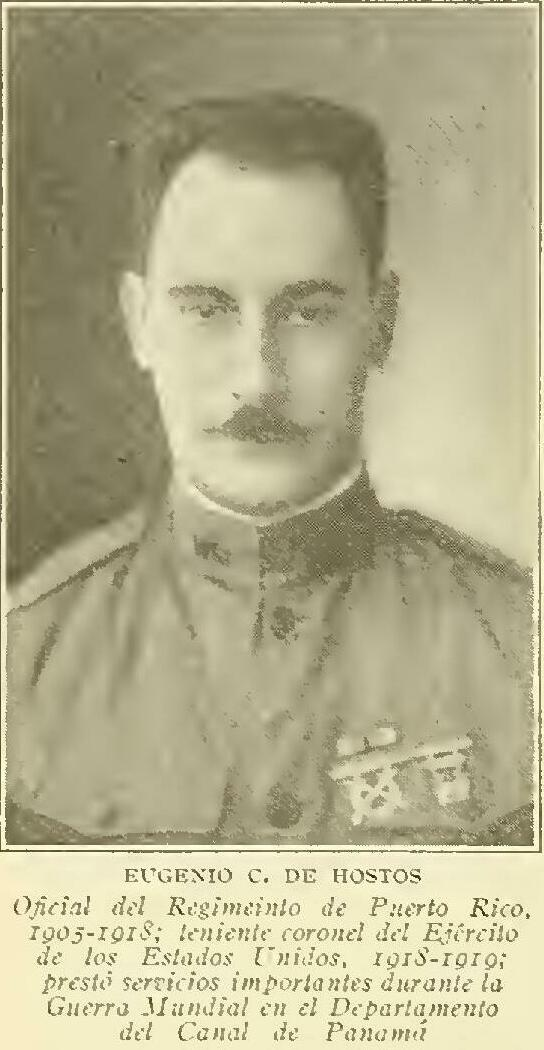
His son Carlos served in World War I in Panama

In 1875, Hostos went to Puerto Plata, Second Dominican Republic, briefly visiting Santo Domingo. He conceived the idea of a normal school (teachers' college) and introduced advanced teaching methods, although these were openly opposed by the local Catholic Church, as Hostos opposed any sort of religious instruction in the educational process. Nonetheless, his response to this criticism was calm and constructive, as many of his writings reveal. In April 1876, Hostos returned to New York and in November he traveled to Caracas, Venezuela, where he married Belinda Otilia de Ayala Quintana (1862–1917), from Cuba, on July 9, 1877. Their wedding was officiated by the Archbishop of Caracas, José Antonio Ponte, and their maid of honor was the Puerto Rican poet, abolitionist, women's rights activist and Puerto Rican independence advocate Lola Rodríguez de Tió. He returned to the Dominican Republic in 1879 and in February 1880 the first normal school was inaugurated. He was named director and he helped establish a second normal school in the city of Santiago de los Caballeros.

Hostos and his family returned to Chile in 1889. He directed the Liceos of Chillán (1889–1890) and Santiago de Chile (1890–1898) and taught law at the University of Chile.

== Later years and death ==
Hostos returned to the United States in 1898 before relocating with his family to Santo Domingo in January 1900. In his last years, Hostos actively participated in the Puerto Rican and Cuban independence movements; his hopes for Puerto Rico's independence after the Spanish–American War turned into disappointment when the United States government rejected his proposals and instead converted the island into its own colony.

In the Dominican Republic, Hostos continued to play a major role in reorganizing the educational and railroad systems. He wrote many essays on social science topics, such as psychology, logic, literature and law, and is considered one of the first systematic sociologists in Latin America. He was also known to be a supporter of women's rights.

On August 11, 1903, Hostos died in Santo Domingo, aged 64. He is buried in the National Pantheon located in the colonial district of that city. Per his final wishes, his remains are to stay permanently in the Dominican Republic until the day Puerto Rico is completely independent. Then and only then, does he want to be reinterred in his homeland. Hostos wrote his own epitaph:

"I wish that they will say: In that island (Puerto Rico) a man was born who loved truth, desired justice, and worked for the good of men."

== Honors and recognitions ==
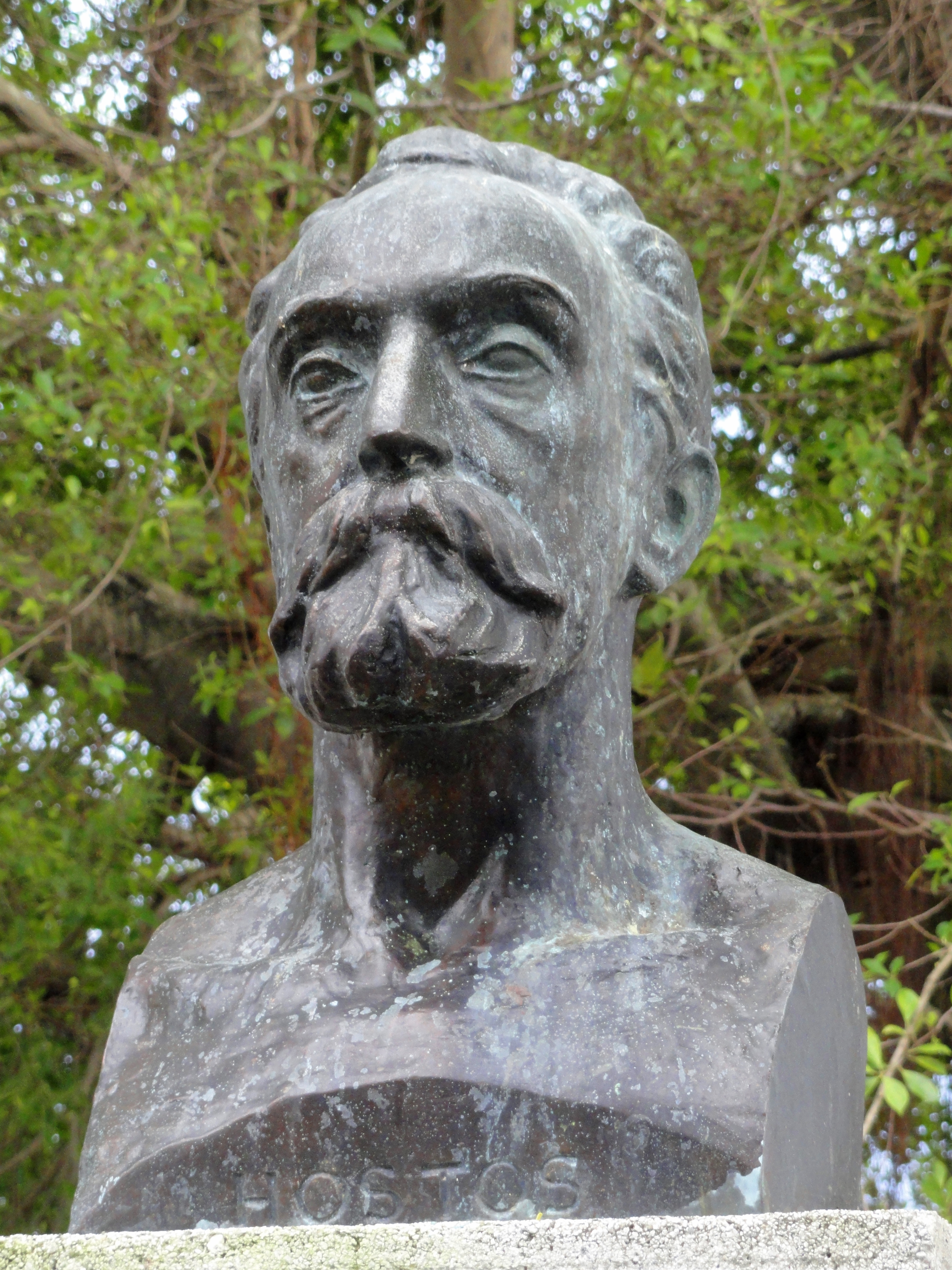
Bust of Eugenio María de Hostos in San Juan, Puerto Rico

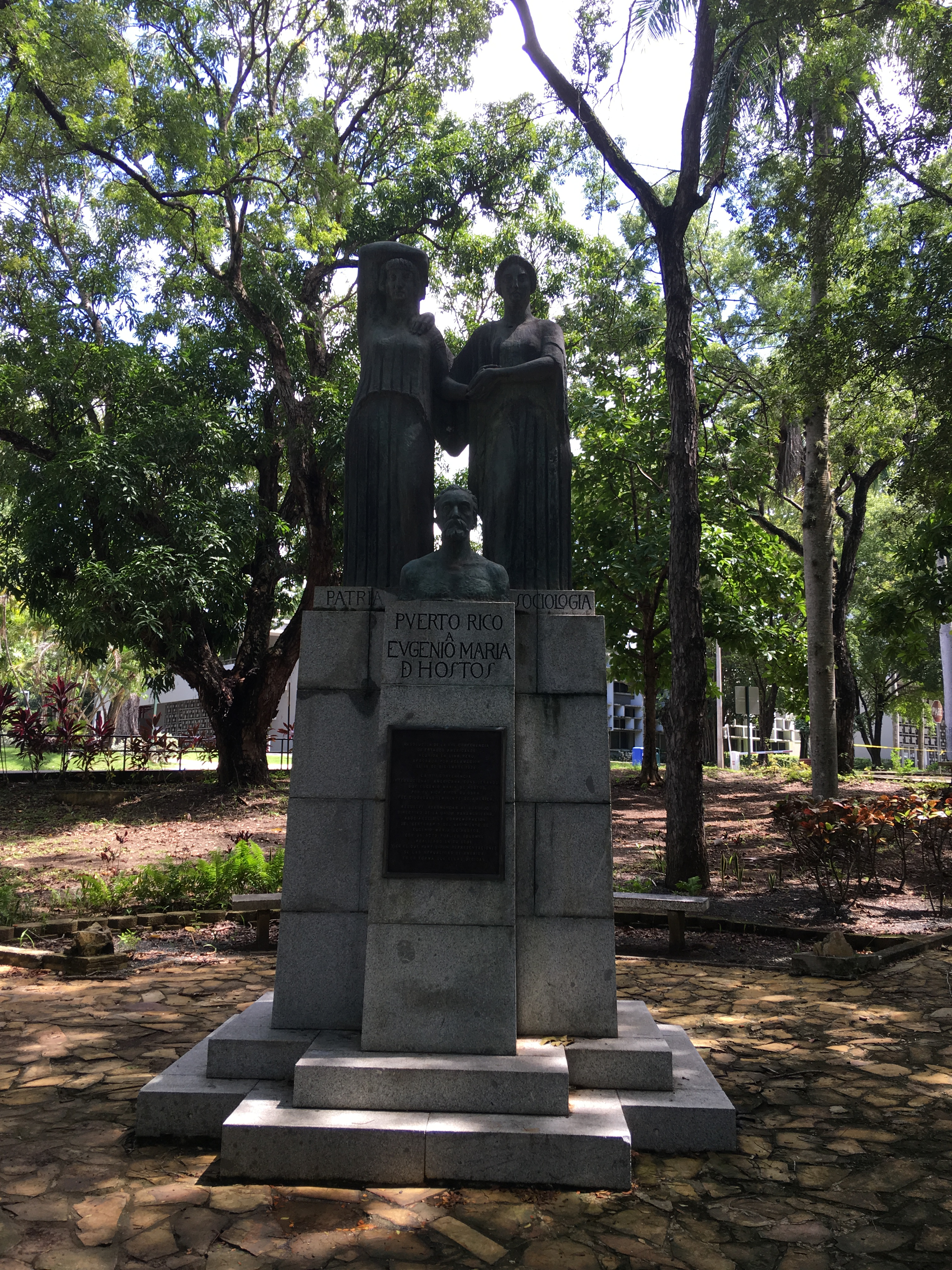
Statue of Hostos on the University of Puerto Rico, Rio Piedras Campus

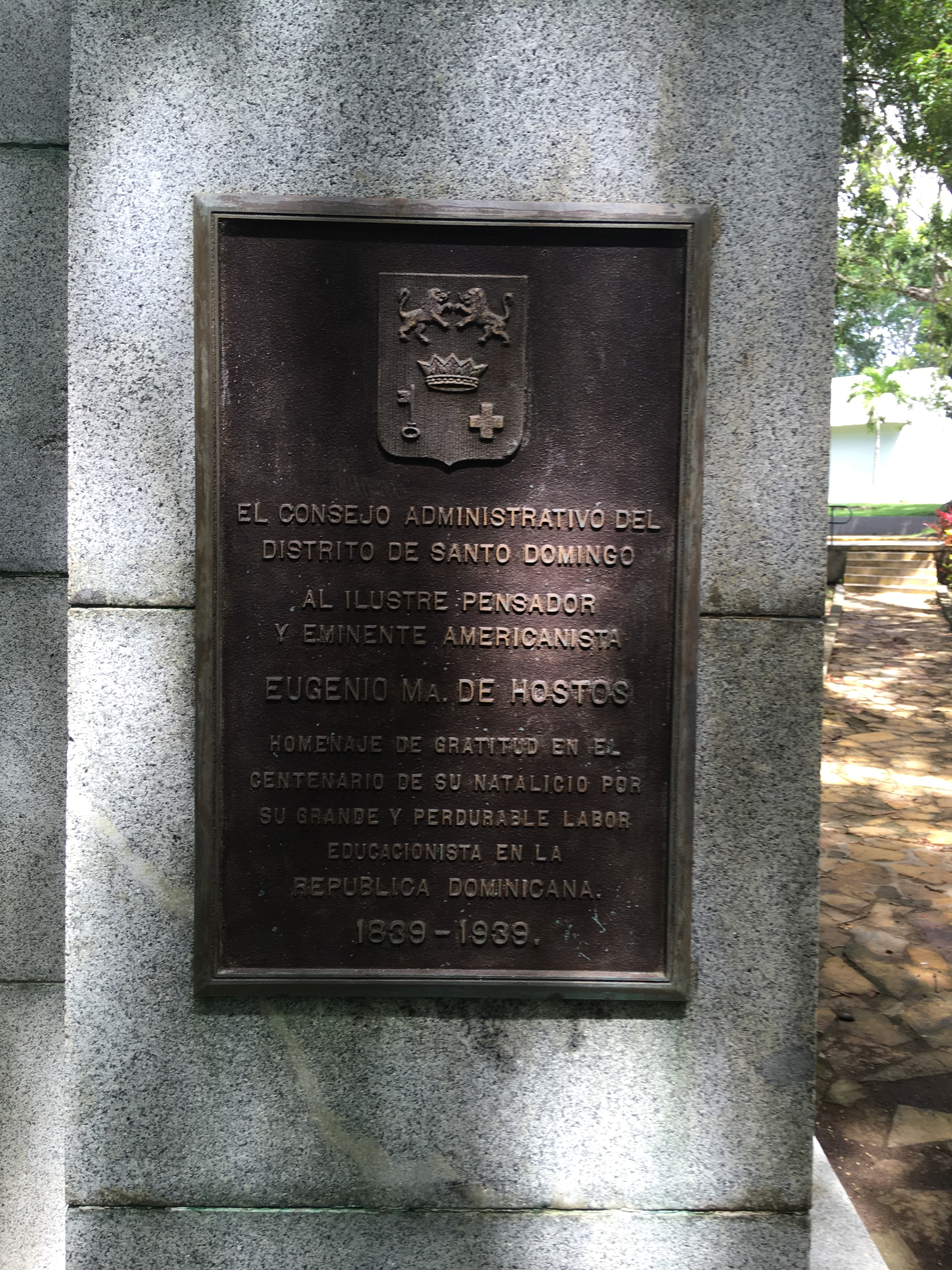
Plaque dedicated to Eugenio María de Hostos at the University of Puerto Rico

- In 1938, the 8th International Conference of America, celebrated in Lima, Peru, posthumously paid tribute to Hostos and declared him "Citizen of the Americas and Teacher of the Youth". Puerto Rico declared his birthday an official holiday, Natalicio de Eugenio María de Hostos, celebrated on the second Monday of January. There is a monument honoring Hostos in Spain.
- A municipality was named after him in the Dominican Republic, in Duarte Province.

=== Monuments ===
In Puerto Rico there are multiple monuments dedicated to Hostos:

- One sculpture created by Tomás Batista was located in a small plaza at the side of Highway 2 at the northern entrance to his native city of Mayagüez. It has since been relocated in front of the entrance to the University of Puerto Rico, Mayagüez Campus;
- Another was created by José Buscaglia Guillermety. Recently, located inside the University of Puerto Rico, Río Piedras Campus in San Juan.
- A 1998 sculpture is in the center of Plaza de la Beneficencia in Old San Juan.

=== Schools ===
The Municipality of Mayagüez inaugurated a cultural center and museum near his birthplace in Río Cañas Arriba ward. The city of Mayagüez also has named in his honor:

- A high school building inaugurated in 1954;
- A highway (now avenue) in 1961;
- Eugenio María de Hostos Airport, formerly El Maní Airport, in 1986.
- In 1995, the Eugenio María de Hostos School of Law was established in Mayagüez, Puerto Rico. The Hostos Law School aspired to achieve the development of legal professionals who are also responsive to the needs of their communities and embraced Hostos' educational philosophy.

Elsewhere in the United States, there are other schools named after him:

- In 1970, the City University of New York inaugurated Hostos Community College, located in the South Bronx. The school serves as a starting point for many students who wish to seek careers in such fields as dental hygiene, gerontology, and public administration.
- There is an intermediate school in Brooklyn, New York named for Hostos (I. S. 318).
- There is a pre-K and kindergarten school named for him in Union City, New Jersey.
- Eugenio María de Hostos Microsociety School, an elementary school in Yonkers, New York is named for him.
- Eugenio María de Hostos Bilingual Charter School, a bilingual K-8 charter school in Philadelphia, Pennsylvania is named for him.
- The City of New York also named a playground after him.

=== Portals ===
The Miguel Cervantes Virtual Library of Spain has dedicated a portal on its website to Eugenio María de Hostos.

His works were digitized by the National Foundation of Popular Culture of Puerto Rico in November 2019.

== Works ==
Among his written works are the following:

- La Peregrinación de Bayoán (1863);
- "Las doctrinas y los hombres" (1866);
- "El día de América";
- "Ayacucho" (1870);
- "El cholo" (1870);
- "La educación científica de la mujer" (1873);
- "Lecciones de derecho constitucional. Santo Domingo: Cuna de América" (1887);
- Moral Social (1888, Imprenta García Hermanos);
- "Geografía evolutiva" (1895).

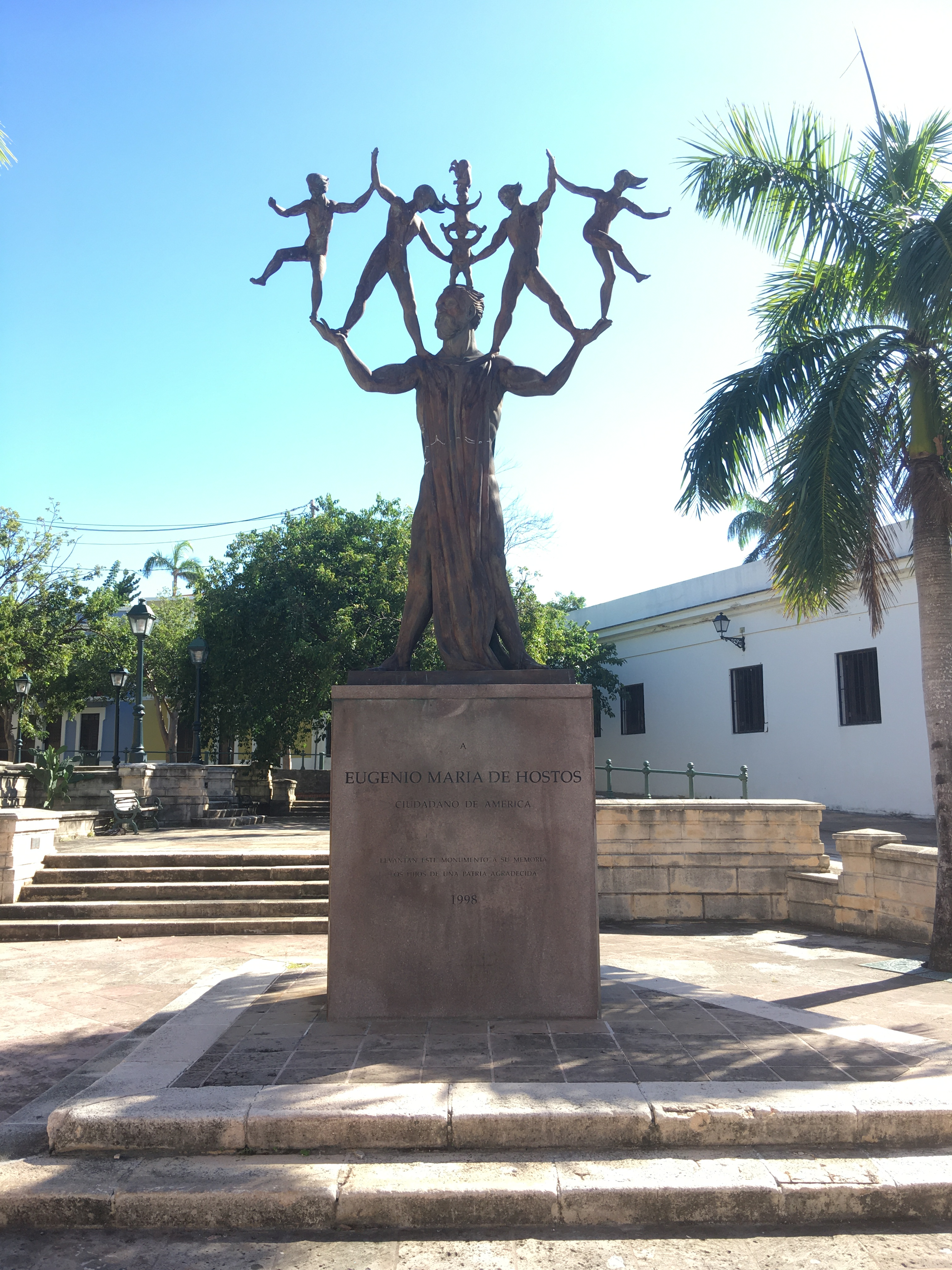
Eugenio María de Hostos, Plaza de la Beneficencia, San Juan, Puerto Rico

== Family ==
Hostos and Belinda Otilia de Ayala y Quintana had six children:

- Eugenio Carlos (1879–1959)
- Luisa Amelia (b. 1881)
- Bayoán Lautaro (b. 1885)
- Adolfo Jose (1887–1982)
- Filipo Luis Duarte (1890–1969)
- María Angelina (1892–1982)

=== Ancestry ===
The Ostos family name originated in Écija, Seville, as early as 1437. Eugenio de Ostos y del Valle was born in Écija around the year 1700 and later moved to Camagüey, Cuba, where he married María Josefa del Castillo y Aranda in 1735. Their son Juan José de Ostos y del Castillo was born in Camagüey in 1750 and moved to Santo Domingo, Dominican Republic. Sometime after France seized control of the entire island of Hispaniola in 1795, Juan José changed the spelling of his surname to Hostos. This spelling was inherited by all his descendants. After the Haitian invasion of Santo Domingo in December 1800, Juan José relocated to Mayagüez, Puerto Rico, where he married María Altagracia Rodríguez Velasco (born in 1785 in Santo Domingo) in 1806. This was his second marriage, following the death of his first wife, María Blanco. Before his death in 1816, Juan José had four children with María, the second of which was Eugenio de Hostos y Rodríguez, born in 1807, who later became Secretary to Isabella II of Spain. Eugenio married María Hilaria de Bonilla y Cintrón in Mayagüez in 1831. Their sixth child (out of seven) was named after both parents: Eugenio María de Hostos y de Bonilla.

Ancestors of Eugenio María de Hostos

8. Don Eugenio de Ostos y Del Valle; b. Ecija, Seville, Spain
4. Don Juan José de Ostos y del Castillo; b. 1750, Camagüey, Cuba
9. Doña María Josefa del Castillo y Aranda
2. Don Eugenio María de Hostos y Rodríguez; b. 1807, Mayagüez, Puerto Rico
10.Don José María Rodríguez
5. Doña María Altagracia Rodriguez y Velasco; b. Dominican Republic.
11. Doña María Belén Velasco; b. San Carlos, Dominican Republic.
1. Eugenio María de Hostos; b. 1839, Mayagüez, Puerto Rico
6. Don Francisco Javier de Bonilla; b. Puerto Rico
3. Doña María Hilaria de Bonilla y Cintron
7. Doña Antonia Cintrón; b. Puerto Rico

== See also ==
- List of Puerto Rican writers
- List of Puerto Ricans
- Puerto Rican literature
- Caribbean literature
