= Loma de La Joya =

- Loma De La Joya, Duarte, Dominican Republic
- Coordinates: 19°22′59.9988″N 70°16′59.9982″W
- Country: Dominican Republic
- Province: Duarte

La Loma de La Joya is a small rural town in the Duarte Province of Dominican Republic. It is located in the northeast portion of the country, in the Cibao region.
