= Eladio Romero Santos =

- Born: Eladio Romero Santos; February 12, 1937; Cenoví, San Francisco de Macorís, Dominican Republic
- Died: April 24, 2001 (aged 64)
- Genres: Latin; Bachata
- Occupations: Musician; singer
- Instruments: Vocals; guitar
- Years active: 1970–1998
- Label: Jose Luis Records

Eladio Romero Santos was a Dominican musician. Originally from Cenoví, a town outside of San Francisco de Macorís, Santos' career spans over forty years. Santos started recording bachata in 1966 with his first song "Tomando En Tu Mesa". Since he performed mostly in country social clubs and for patron saints' festivals, he was not marginalized as were many of his fellow bachateros. Santos' style was much simpler and more straightforward than that of other guitarists such as Edilio Paredes; it was also rhythmic and danceable. He contracted arthritis in 1995 and was forced to stop playing the guitar. After 1995, he only performed as a singer. Romero Santos retired in 1998. He died three years later, in 2001, of lung cancer. his sister Leonilda Alejo moved to the United States and made some very popular songs such as Mamita and sera porque soy pobre. she currently now lives in the United states and has quit her music career.

== Relevance ==
Santos is specially remembered because he developed an innovative way to perform the merengue with guitars, in opposition to the traditional way of the conjunto tipico or the combos (another popular urban style of orchestra).

== Discography ==
- El Creador (1970)
- El Zumbador (1970)
- La Muerte de Mi Hermano (1970)
- La Muñeca (1970)
- Las Bailadoras (1970)
- La Madrugadora (1978)
- La Viuda (1979)
- La Mujer Policía (1980)
- El Sabor de Mi Guitarra (1980)
- Eladio Romero Santos (1981)
- Eladio Romero Santos Presenta a Francisco Ulloa y el Conjunto San Rafael (with Francisco Ulloa) (1981)
- Muchacha Dominicana (1988)
- 15 Éxitos (1990)
- Éxitos Vol. 2 (1990)
