= Camú River =

Camú River Río Camú
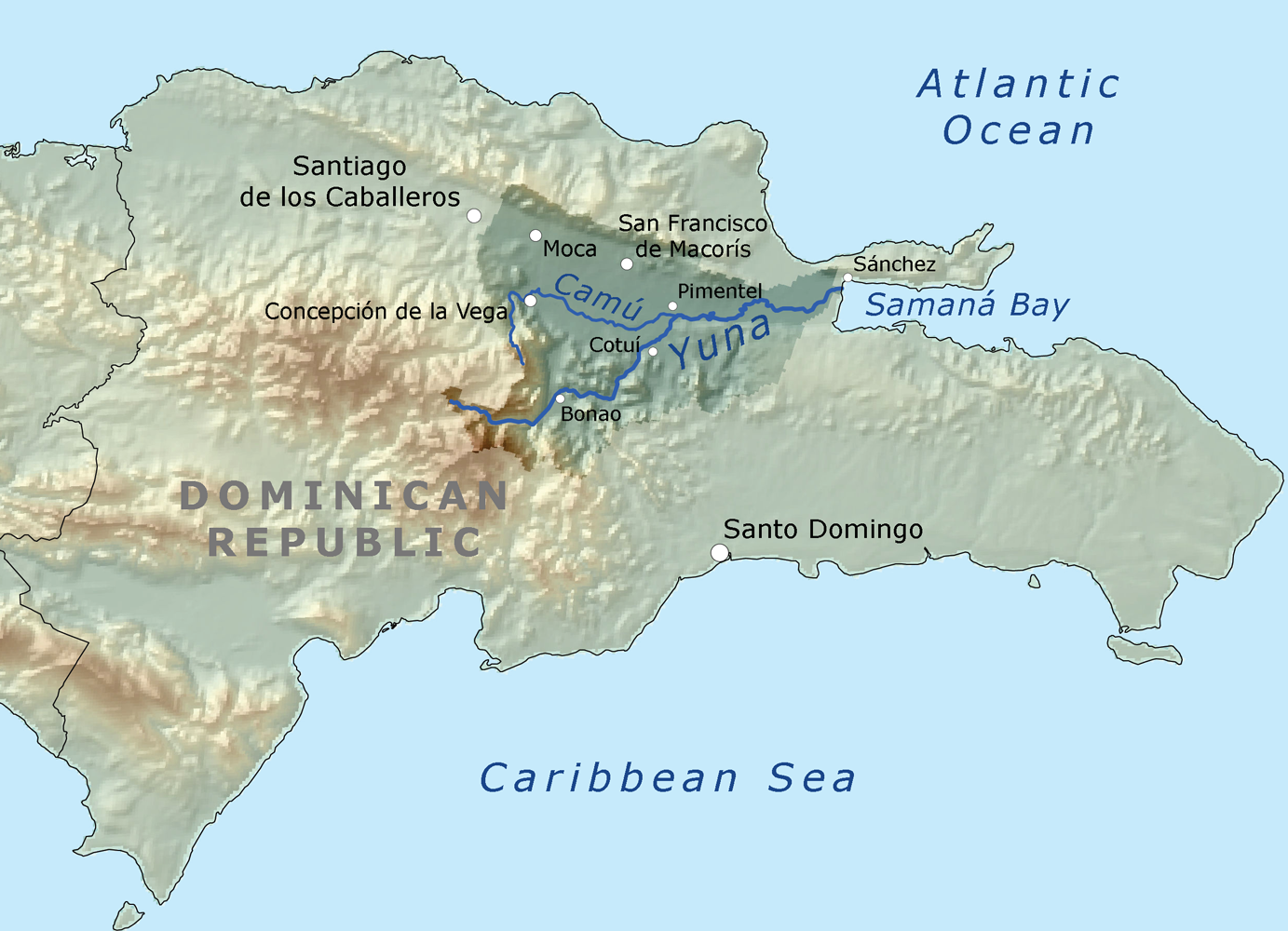
- Map showing the Camú River within the Yuna drainage basin.

Location
- Country: Dominican Republic
- Provinces: La Vega, Sánchez Ramírez, Duarte
- Cities: Concepción de la Vega, Jima Arriba

Physical characteristics
- Source: Ebano Verde
  - location: Los Saltaderos, La Vega, Dominican Republic
  - coordinates: 19°2′35.178″N 70°31′24.042″W
  - elevation: 1,300 m (4,300 ft)
- Mouth: Yuna River
  - location: Pimentel, Duarte / La Mata, Sánchez Ramírez, Dominican Republic
  - coordinates: 19°9′11″N 70°5′49″W
  - elevation: 0 m (0 ft)
- Length: 141.83 km (88.13 mi)

Basin features
- Tributaries
  - left: Yami River, Bayacanes River, Licey River, Bacui River, Cenoví River, Jagua River, Guiza River
  - right: Jaguey River, Jima River, Cuaya River

The Camú River (Spanish: Río Camú ) is 141.83 km (88.13 mi) long river located in the northern Dominican Republic. It rises in Cordillera Central, flowing first north and then east past the city of Concepción de la Vega before reaching its mouth at the Yuna River near the city of Pimentel at the Duarte and Sánchez Ramírez province line.
