= Las Guáranas =

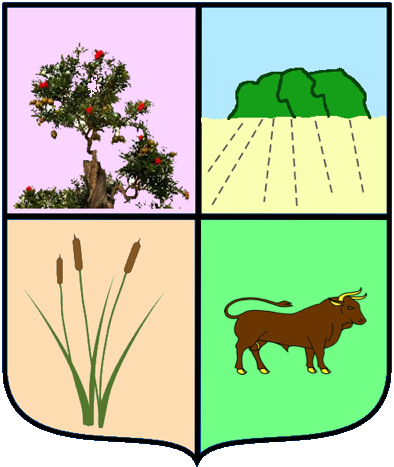
- Coat of arms

- Location within the Dominican Republic
- Coordinates: 19°12′0″N 70°13′12″W
- Country: Dominican Republic
- Province: Duarte
- Founded: n.a.
- Municipality since: 1998

Area
  - Total: 86.49 km^{2} (33.39 sq mi)

Population (2012)
  - Total: 19,969
  - Density: 230.9/km^{2} (598.0/sq mi)
  - Demonym: Guaranero(a)
- Municipal Districts: 0

Las Guáranas is a town in the Duarte Province of the Dominican Republic, about 12 km from the city of San Francisco de Macorís. As of 2012 the population was 19,969.

== Administrative divisions ==
The municipality of Las Guáranas is divided into different sectors: San Juan, Pueblo Nuevo, Ernesto Reyes, Sector Iglesias, Las Flores, Agua Viva Arriba Y Agua Viva Abajo, San Jose, Las Mercedes, Los Genao, Los Jardines, La Factoria, Aurelia, Los Riveras and Dario Antonio.
