= Castillo, Dominican Republic =

Castillo
- Location within the Dominican Republic
- Coordinates: 19°13′12″N 70°1′48″W
- Country: Dominican Republic
- Province: Duarte
- Founded: n.a.
- Municipality since: 1907

Area
  - Total: 133.68 km^{2} (51.61 sq mi)

Population (2012)
  - Total: 20,258
  - Density: 151.54/km^{2} (392.49/sq mi)
  - Urban: 8,965
- Municipal Districts: 0

Castillo is a municipality of the Duarte Province in the Dominican Republic.

It was named after General Manuel María Castillo, hero of the Dominican Restoration.

The first inhabitants came to the area between 1718 and 1730 from foreign and neighboring communities, such as San Francisco de Macorís, Salcedo, Moca, and La Vega.
