= Gilda Jovine =

Dominican actress and model

- Born: Gilda Gross; February 10, 1980 (age 46); Santo Domingo, Dominican Republic
- Beauty pageant titleholder
- Title: Miss Universe Dominicana 2000
- Major competitions: Miss Universe Dominicana 2000 (Winner); Miss Universe 2000 (Unplaced); Miss World 2000 (Unplaced)

Gilda Gross (born February 10, 1980, in Santo Domingo), commonly known as Gilda Jovine is a Dominican actress, model and beauty pageant titleholder.

She was born and raised in Santo Domingo to a businessman from the United States and a businesswoman from Constanza. Jovine was inspired by her grandmother, one of the first dressmakers for Oscar De La Renta. Jovine began modeling at age 15 and has participated in fashion shows in the Dominican Republic, New York City, and Puerto Rico. She has also appeared in magazines, billboards, and catalogs, and has acted in several television commercials.

In 1999, Jovine participated in and won the Miss Latina International pageant held in New York City. The next year, she became Miss Dominican Republic 2000 representing the municipality of Constanza. She represented her country in the Miss Universe 2000 pageant, held in Cyprus, and at Miss World 2000 in London. Jovine typically wears blue pageant dresses. Standing nearly 6 feet, Jovine was among the taller contestants in Miss Dominican Republic 2000.

Jovine graduated from the Barbizon School in New York City and Universidad Iberoamericana in Santo Domingo majoring in Public Relations, but what she loved most was painting. Some of her work has been displayed in New York galleries such as Salon 94 and Art Gotham.

Preceded by Luz García	Miss Dominican Republic; 2000	Succeeded by Claudia Cruz de los Santos
