= Cenoví =

- Location within the Dominican Republic
- Coordinates: 19°15′0″N 70°22′12″W
- Country: Dominican Republic
- Province: Duarte
- Municipality: San Francisco de Macorís
- Founded: n.a.
- Municipal District since: 2000

Area
  - Total: 88.45 km^{2} (34.15 sq mi)

Population (2002)
  - Total: 16,056
  - Estimate (2008): 17,857
  - Density: 181.5/km^{2} (470.2/sq mi)
  - Urban: 602

Cenoví is a town in the Duarte Province of the Dominican Republic.

== Sources ==
- World Gazeteer: Dominican Republic – World-Gazetteer.com
