= Sánchez, Dominican Republic =

Sánchez
- Sánchez in the Dominican Republic
- Coordinates: 19°13′45″N 69°36′52″W
- Country: Dominican Republic
- Province: Samaná

Area
  - Total: 328.53 km^{2} (126.85 sq mi)

Population (2002)
  - Total: 20,865
  - Density: 63.510/km^{2} (164.49/sq mi)

Sánchez is a municipality located in the Samaná Province of the Dominican Republic, situated on the southern coast of the Samaná Peninsula.

== History ==
Originally known as Las Cañitas, the town was designated a municipality in 1866 and renamed in honor of Francisco del Rosario Sánchez, one of the founding fathers of the Dominican Republic. Sánchez initially thrived as a small town but gained significant importance with the introduction of a railway linking it to La Vega in the Cibao region. This railway helped Sánchez become one of the country's most vital ports in the late 19th and early 20th centuries. However, by 1966, the railway ceased operations, and Sánchez's port began to lose its prominence. Over time, the Yuna River has deposited sediment into Samaná Bay, restricting access to the port to smaller vessels.

== Climate ==
Sánchez has a tropical climate characterized by a marked wet and dry season. Temperatures generally range from 20°C (68°F) to 32°C (90°F) throughout the year. The hottest months are typically May and July, with temperatures occasionally reaching up to 39°C (102°F). The municipality receives substantial rainfall, averaging around 2,064.5 mm (81.2 inches) annually. Rainfall is heaviest from May to November, with the dry season occurring from December to April.

Climate data for Sánchez, Dominican Republic (1961–1990)
Month	Jan	Feb	Mar	Apr	May	Jun	Jul	Aug	Sep	Oct	Nov	Dec	Year
Record high °C (°F)	36.0 (96.8)	35.2 (95.4)	36.5 (97.7)	37.5 (99.5)	39.0 (102.2)	38.0 (100.4)	39.0 (102.2)	38.0 (100.4)	38.4 (101.1)	38.2 (100.8)	38.0 (100.4)	35.2 (95.4)	39.0 (102.2)
Mean daily maximum °C (°F)	29.8 (85.6)	30.1 (86.2)	30.5 (86.9)	30.9 (87.6)	31.7 (89.1)	32.3 (90.1)	32.4 (90.3)	32.1 (89.8)	32.3 (90.1)	32.2 (90.0)	30.4 (86.7)	29.5 (85.1)	31.2 (88.2)
Mean daily minimum °C (°F)	20.2 (68.4)	20.4 (68.7)	20.8 (69.4)	21.3 (70.3)	22.8 (73.0)	23.7 (74.7)	23.7 (74.7)	23.5 (74.3)	23.3 (73.9)	23.1 (73.6)	22.0 (71.6)	20.8 (69.4)	22.1 (71.8)
Record low °C (°F)	15.0 (59.0)	15.0 (59.0)	15.5 (59.9)	16.0 (60.8)	16.4 (61.5)	19.5 (67.1)	19.2 (66.6)	18.0 (64.4)	20.0 (68.0)	19.7 (67.5)	17.0 (62.6)	15.9 (60.6)	15.0 (59.0)
Average rainfall mm (inches)	123.5 (4.86)	96.6 (3.80)	112.0 (4.41)	147.1 (5.79)	236.3 (9.30)	154.1 (6.07)	195.0 (7.68)	219.4 (8.64)	183.4 (7.22)	190.9 (7.52)	225.2 (8.87)	181.0 (7.13)	2,064.5 (81.28)
Average rainy days (≥ 1.0 mm)	13.3	9.5	9.7	9.5	14.6	12.8	14.6	14.9	13.8	15.1	15.9	15.7	159.4
Source: NOAA

== Economy ==
Agriculture is the primary economic activity in Sánchez. Historically, fishing played a significant role in the local economy, but its importance has diminished over time. Today, agriculture dominates, reflecting the municipality's adaptation to changing economic conditions.
