= Agua Santa del Yuna =

- Location within the Dominican Republic
- Coordinates: 19°9′0″N 69°48′0″W
- Country: Dominican Republic
- Province: Duarte

Population (2008)
  - Total: 1,865

Agua Santa del Yuna is a town in Duarte Province of the Dominican Republic.

== Sources ==
- World Gazetteer: Dominican Republic – World-Gazetteer.com
