= Río Cañas Arriba, Mayagüez, Puerto Rico =

Barrio of Puerto Rico

Río Cañas Arriba
- Barrio
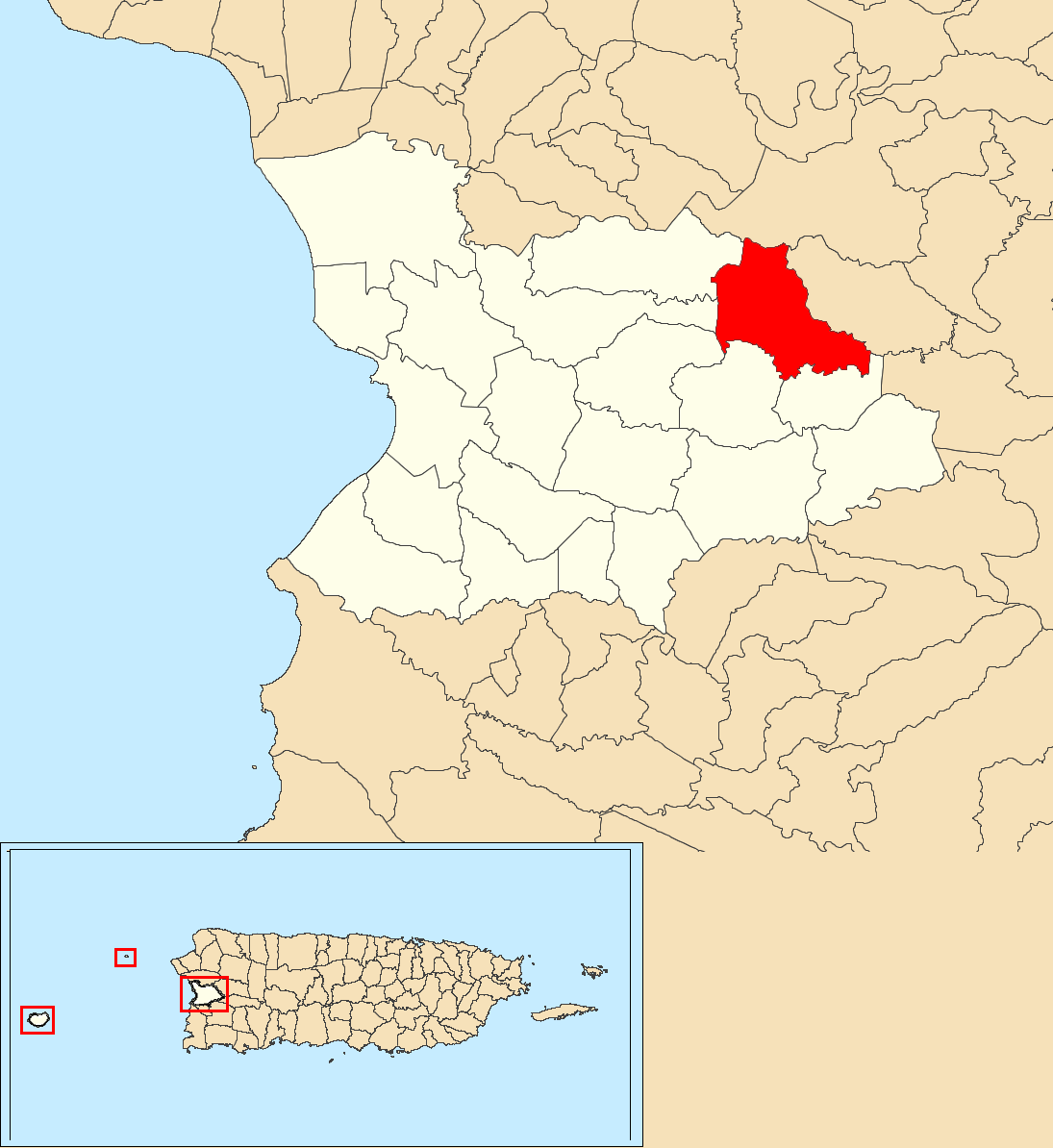
- Location of Río Cañas Arriba within the municipality of Mayagüez shown in red

- Location of Puerto Rico
- Coordinates: 18°13′41″N 67°03′30″W
- Commonwealth: Puerto Rico
- Municipality: Mayagüez

Area
  - Total: 3.12 sq mi (8.1 km^{2})
  - Land: 3.12 sq mi (8.1 km^{2})
  - Water: 0 sq mi (0 km^{2})
- Elevation: 886 ft (270 m)

Population (2010)
  - Total: 1,354
  - Density: 434/sq mi (168/km^{2})
- Source: 2010 Census
- Time zone: UTC−4 (AST)

Río Cañas Arriba is a barrio in the municipality of Mayagüez, Puerto Rico. Its population in 2010 was 1,354.

== History ==
Río Cañas Arriba was in Spain's gazetteers until Puerto Rico was ceded by Spain in the aftermath of the Spanish–American War under the terms of the Treaty of Paris of 1898 and became an unincorporated territory of the United States. In 1899, the United States Department of War conducted a census of Puerto Rico finding that the combined population of Río Cañas Arriba barrio and Naranjales barrio was 1,048.

Historical population
Census	Pop.	Note	%±
1910	631		—
1920	588		−6.8%
1930	454		−22.8%
1940	641		41.2%
1950	798		24.5%
1960	827		3.6%
1970	911		10.2%
1980	1,318		44.7%
1990	1,254		−4.9%
2000	1,495		19.2%
2010	1,354		−9.4%
U.S. Decennial Census; 1900 (N/A) 1910-1930; 1930-1950 1980-2000 2010

== See also ==
- List of communities in Puerto Rico
