= Hostos =

Eugenio María de Hostos. La Ceiba, de Hostos
- Location within the Dominican Republic
- Coordinates: 19°10′48″N 70°1′12″W
- Country: Dominican Republic
- Province: Duarte Province

Population (2008)
  - Total: 1 848

Hostos is a town in the Duarte Province of the Dominican Republic. It was named after Eugenio María de Hostos.

== Sources ==
- – World-Gazetteer.com
