= Villa Riva =

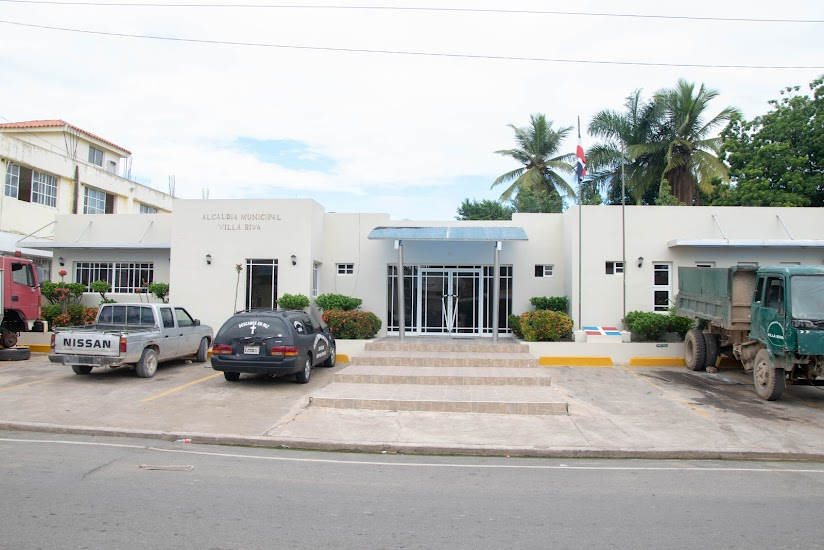

- Location within the Dominican Republic
- Coordinates: 19°10′48″N 69°55′12″W
- Country: Dominican Republic
- Province: Duarte
- Founded: n.a.
- Municipality since: 1876

Area
  - Total: 309.93 km^{2} (119.66 sq mi)
- Elevation: 19 m (62 ft)

Population (2012)
  - Total: 30,989
  - Density: 99.987/km^{2} (258.97/sq mi)
- Municipal Districts: 4

Villa Riva is a town and municipality (municipio) of the Duarte Province in the Dominican Republic.

== History ==
The community of El Cercado was founded in 1845 by President Pedro Santana. It previously belonged to the municipality of Bánica and was called the Sabana del Bohío, and was elevated to town by a war veteran, Francisco Rodriguez. The first families to settle in this area were Florencio Montero, Telésforo de Oleo, Encarnación, Manuelica y Fidel Matos and Leonardo Brito. El Cercado people have the reputation for being very hospitable, friendly and kind.

The main economic source is agriculture consisting of cattle, snuff, honey, wax, leather and coffee. The main form of communication was the horse, which started the mail service.

== Climate ==
Villa Riva has a tropical rainforest climate (Köppen climate classification: Af).

Climate data for Villa Riva (1961–1990)
Month	Jan	Feb	Mar	Apr	May	Jun	Jul	Aug	Sep	Oct	Nov	Dec	Year
Record high °C (°F)	34.0 (93.2)	36.0 (96.8)	38.5 (101.3)	36.5 (97.7)	36.5 (97.7)	36.5 (97.7)	36.5 (97.7)	36.8 (98.2)	37.4 (99.3)	38.0 (100.4)	37.0 (98.6)	35.0 (95.0)	38.5 (101.3)
Mean daily maximum °C (°F)	29.5 (85.1)	30.2 (86.4)	30.6 (87.1)	31.3 (88.3)	32.3 (90.1)	32.5 (90.5)	32.4 (90.3)	32.5 (90.5)	32.6 (90.7)	32.4 (90.3)	31.0 (87.8)	29.9 (85.8)	31.4 (88.5)
Mean daily minimum °C (°F)	19.3 (66.7)	19.7 (67.5)	20.1 (68.2)	20.7 (69.3)	21.7 (71.1)	21.8 (71.2)	22.1 (71.8)	22.2 (72.0)	21.8 (71.2)	21.7 (71.1)	20.7 (69.3)	19.8 (67.6)	21.0 (69.8)
Record low °C (°F)	14.5 (58.1)	13.0 (55.4)	12.5 (54.5)	16.0 (60.8)	16.0 (60.8)	16.0 (60.8)	16.2 (61.2)	16.4 (61.5)	15.4 (59.7)	16.2 (61.2)	15.2 (59.4)	13.2 (55.8)	12.5 (54.5)
Average rainfall mm (inches)	123.9 (4.88)	109.6 (4.31)	126.1 (4.96)	141.0 (5.55)	240.5 (9.47)	224.5 (8.84)	206.1 (8.11)	238.5 (9.39)	229.6 (9.04)	180.9 (7.12)	222.3 (8.75)	198.4 (7.81)	2,241.4 (88.24)
Average rainy days (≥ 1.0 mm)	10.1	8.3	8.6	8.6	12.9	14.2	13.6	14.4	12.4	11.2	12.9	11.7	138.9
Source: NOAA
