= Pimentel, Dominican Republic =

Pimentel
- Location within the Dominican Republic
- Coordinates: 19°11′30″N 70°6′0″W
- Country: Dominican Republic
- Province: Duarte
- Founded: n.a.
- Municipality since: 1907

Area
  - Total: 124.67 km^{2} (48.14 sq mi)
- Elevation: 37 m (121 ft)

Population (2012)
  - Total: 35,989
  - Density: 288.67/km^{2} (747.66/sq mi)
- Municipal Districts: 0

Pimentel is a city in the province Duarte and it is the 2nd largest in Duarte and the 25th largest city in the Dominican Republic, founded by Italian immigrants from the Sardinia region.

== Climate ==
Climate data for Pimentel, Dominican Republic (1961–1990)
Month	Jan	Feb	Mar	Apr	May	Jun	Jul	Aug	Sep	Oct	Nov	Dec	Year
Record high °C (°F)	35.0 (95.0)	36.3 (97.3)	36.5 (97.7)	38.0 (100.4)	39.0 (102.2)	38.4 (101.1)	38.0 (100.4)	38.5 (101.3)	39.0 (102.2)	39.0 (102.2)	37.5 (99.5)	38.4 (101.1)	39.0 (102.2)
Mean daily maximum °C (°F)	28.6 (83.5)	29.3 (84.7)	30.6 (87.1)	31.5 (88.7)	32.1 (89.8)	33.1 (91.6)	33.0 (91.4)	33.1 (91.6)	33.5 (92.3)	33.2 (91.8)	30.7 (87.3)	28.8 (83.8)	31.5 (88.7)
Mean daily minimum °C (°F)	18.7 (65.7)	19.3 (66.7)	20.4 (68.7)	21.3 (70.3)	22.3 (72.1)	23.2 (73.8)	23.3 (73.9)	23.4 (74.1)	23.7 (74.7)	23.3 (73.9)	21.1 (70.0)	19.3 (66.7)	21.6 (70.9)
Record low °C (°F)	12.0 (53.6)	12.5 (54.5)	12.5 (54.5)	12.0 (53.6)	15.3 (59.5)	15.0 (59.0)	15.0 (59.0)	16.0 (60.8)	15.0 (59.0)	15.4 (59.7)	12.0 (53.6)	12.0 (53.6)	12.0 (53.6)
Average rainfall mm (inches)	83.3 (3.28)	81.6 (3.21)	90.0 (3.54)	128.6 (5.06)	233.0 (9.17)	167.7 (6.60)	167.4 (6.59)	211.7 (8.33)	144.5 (5.69)	151.3 (5.96)	186.4 (7.34)	156.3 (6.15)	1,801.8 (70.94)
Average rainy days (≥ 1.0 mm)	8.5	7.1	7.0	8.3	12.4	11.1	12.1	12.4	10.7	10.0	11.0	11.1	121.7
Source: NOAA
