= Arenoso =

- Location within the Dominican Republic
- Coordinates: 19°10′48″N 69°51′0″W
- Country: Dominican Republic
- Province: Duarte
- Founded: n.a.
- Municipality since: 1993

Area
  - Total: 142.20 km^{2} (54.90 sq mi)

Population (2012)
  - Total: 17,589
  - Density: 123.69/km^{2} (320.36/sq mi)
  - Urban: 5,989
- Municipal Districts: 2

Arenoso is a town in the Duarte province of the Dominican Republic.

== Sources ==
- World Gazeteer: Dominican Republic – World-Gazetteer.com
