= San Francisco de Macorís =

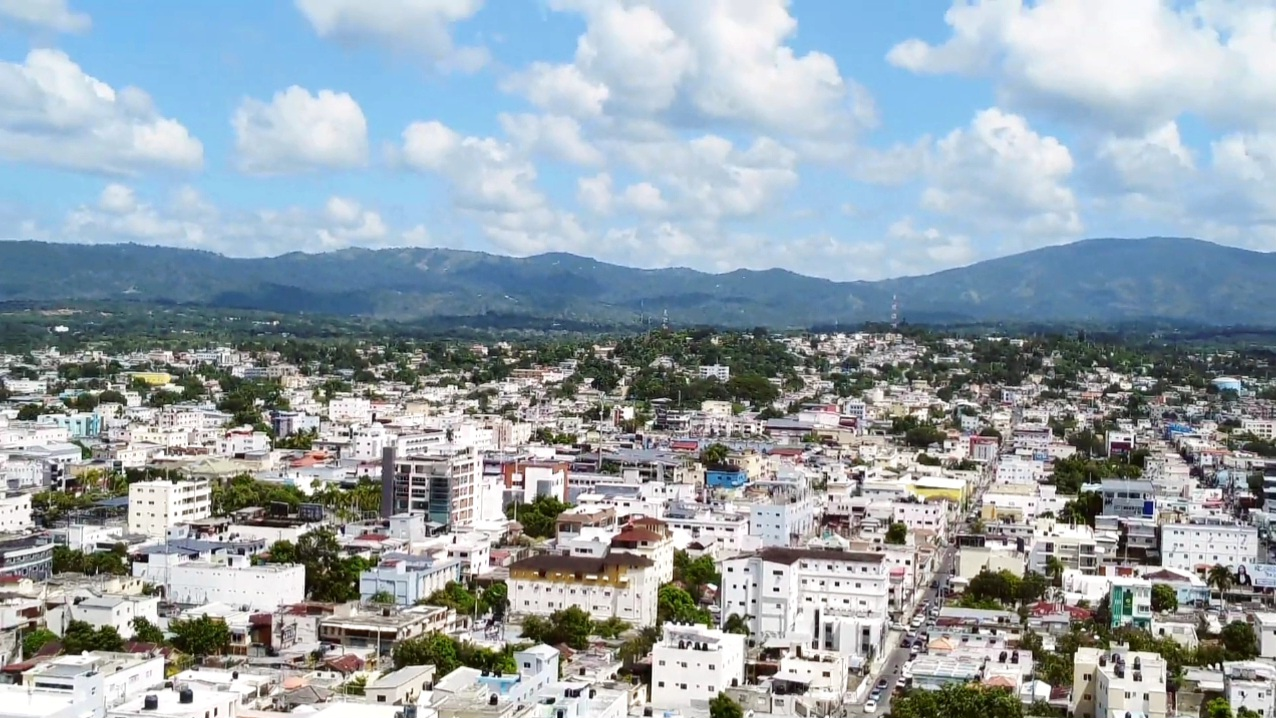
- City view of San Francisco de Macoris.

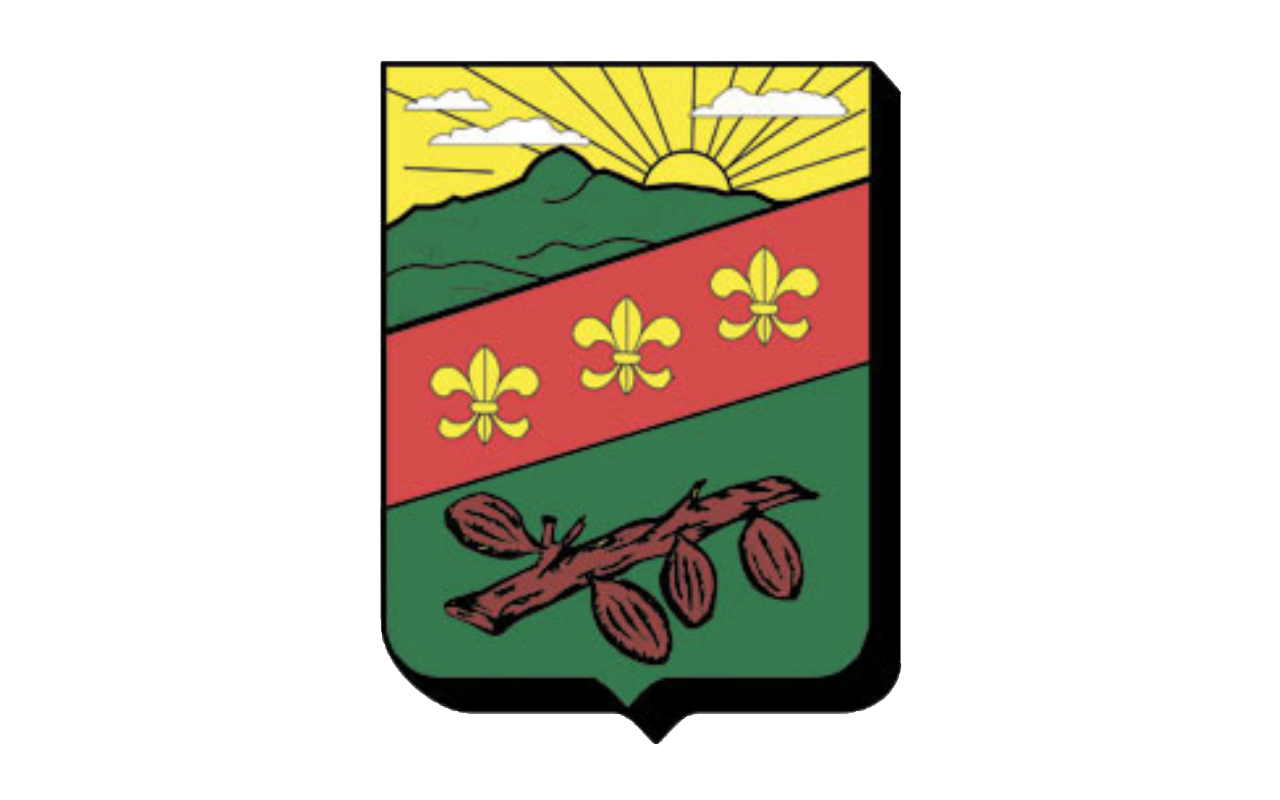
- Flag Coat of arms

- Location within the Dominican Republic
- Coordinates: 19°18′0″N 70°15′0″W
- Country: Dominican Republic
- Province: Duarte
- Founded: 20 September 1778
- Municipality since: 1844

Area
  - Total: 727.15 km^{2} (280.75 sq mi)
- Elevation: 110 m (360 ft)

Population (2022 census)
  - Total: 202,716
  - Density: 278.78/km^{2} (722.04/sq mi)
  - Demonym: Francomacorisano(a)
- Municipal Districts: 4

San Francisco de Macorís (Spanish: [saɱ fɾanˈsisko ðe makoˈɾis]) is a city in the Dominican Republic located in the northeast portion of the country, in the Cibao region. It is the capital of the Duarte Province and the sixth most populated city in the country since 2010. The name San Francisco de Macorís comes from a combination of the name of Saint Francis, patron saint of the Franciscan Order (a religious organization from Italy that had come to this territory during colonization) and the territory's old name, which is Macorix.

The city is known as the Land of Cacao ("Tierra del Cacao"). The area produces large quantities of organic cocoa, making the Dominican Republic the world's 10th largest producer of cocoa beans.

== History ==
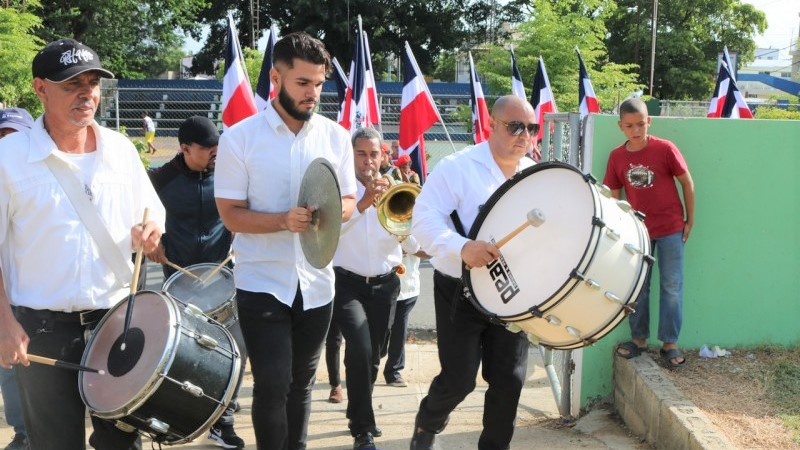
People in San Francisco de Macoris, Dominican Republic

A city was founded near San Francisco de Macorís in 1497. After La Vega was founded, Cotuí was later established in 1505 in a place rich in gold. For centuries what is now San Francisco de Macorís and the Duarte Province were rural outskirts of La Vega and Cotuí respectively. By the beginning of the 18th century, foreign investment from Europeans created a market for the production of cocoa, allowing the locals to gain a new source of income apart from livestock. It was the cocoa market that allowed the community around the Santa Ana monastery to become San Francisco de Macorís. However, it was not until the 1760s that the province gained a monopoly on the cocoa industry and managing to become a town for European travelers to stop by.

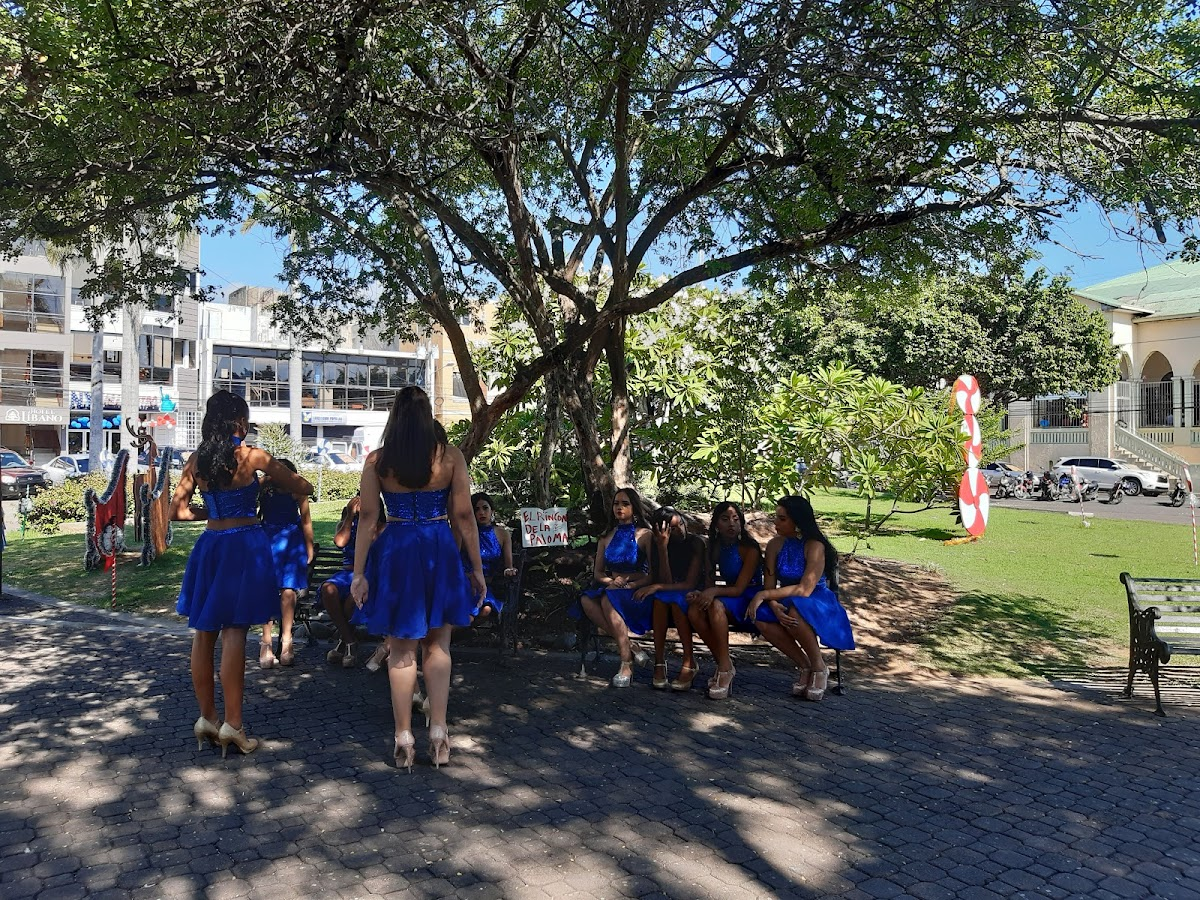
City park

The Villa of Santa Ana of San Francisco de Macorís, also previously called Hato Grande, was named this until it was owned by Francisco Ravelo Polanco, Provincial Mayor of the Santa Hermandad of Santiago de los Caballeros, and tradition later points to Juan de Alvarado and the families Tejada and De Jesus as the owners of the land and donors of the territorial area for the purpose of its foundation in 1778.

In 1795, the Treaty of Basel was ratified, ceding to France the Spanish territory of Hispaniola. France took over the Spanish side in 1801, and under its administration San Francisco de Macorís became a parish with self-government. The official minutes of the city date back to 1811.

On October 2, 1896, Ulises Heureaux reorganized the city of San Francisco de Macorís under the Provincial District "Pacificador" (Peacemaker). At that time it was assigned as common to Cantonal Position of Matanzas, Section Monte Abajo, Villa Riva, Canton Castillo, among others.

District Pacificador's name lasted until July 26, 1926, when the Dominican Congress changed its name to Duarte Province, presently used.

On 20 May 1963 the city council approved the renaming of the main streets of San Francisco de Macorís at the request of the Foundation Heroes of Constanza, Maimon and Estero Hondo.

== Geography ==
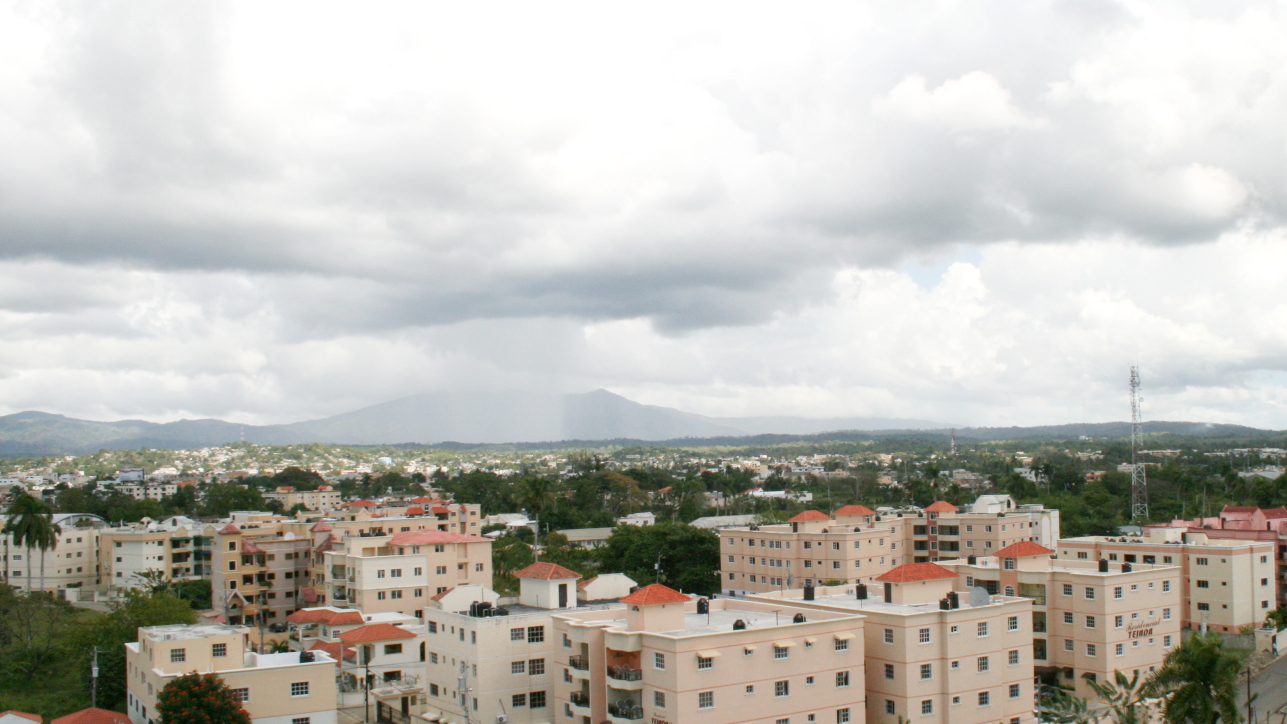
View of San Francisco de Macoris Dominican Republic

The city of San Francisco de Macorís is located in the North Region of the Dominican Republic (Cibao Region) between the Septentrional Mountain Range at the north and the Cibao Valley at the southern part. San Francisco de Macorís has hills to the north which provide a great view of the city during evening hours. The Jaya River is prominent on the western part of town.

=== Districts ===
The city has the following subdivisions:

| Division | Status | Population (2022) |
|---|---|---|
| Cenoví | District | 16,322 |
| Jaya | District | 5,529 |
| La Peña | District | 12,918 |
| Presidente Don Antonio Guzmán Fernández | District | 8,205 |
| San Francisco de Macorís | Municipal Core | 159,742 |

=== Relief ===
The relief of Duarte Province ranges from 17 to 942 metres (56 to 3,091 ft) above sea level, reaching its highest elevation at "Loma Quita Espuela". This name allegedly comes from the time when the Spaniards were exploring the island, since the hill was too steep to ride their horses, they had to dismount and remove their spurs and undertake the ascent on foot. There are two main geologic regions: the north slope of the Cordillera Septentrional and the rough topography of the Delta del Yuna.

On the southern slope of the Cibao Valley in the Yuna Subregion (Easter Cibao), we will find alluvial fans, in combination with deposit hollows, hill areas and platforms, and also alluvial soils into the channels of the flows of the rivers Camú and Yuna.

Two faults go through the Duarte Province from east to west. This tectonic deformations are the Septentrional fault, that touches the towns of Arenoso, Castillo and San Francisco de Macorís and the Cibao fault passing through the towns of Las Guaranas, Castillo, Villa Riva Pimentel. The Septentrional fault is located in the northern part of the province while the Cibao fault is located in the southern part of it.

=== Geomorphology ===
The Yuna River Delta is part of the Cibao Valley, and most of these areas are located a few metres above sea level and therefore wetlands abound. Its main rivers are the Great Yuna and Caño Estero, which are the natural drainage of these lands in the province of Maria Trinidad Sanchez. The area consists mainly of swamps with silt and clay, and also large areas of peat deposits. By the rivers are alluvial deposits.

The Eastern Cibao Valley (also part of the Cibao Valle) is divided into the provinces of Santiago, Espaillat, Sánchez Ramírez, Sánchez and Duarte, the latter having a higher percentage (about 50%). All cities in this province are rooted in this valley except the city of Arenoso. The floodplains of the Yuna River system occupy a narrow strip on the south side of the valley and there is also a narrow chain of hills, probably middle Miocene limestones, adjacent to the north mountain range. For this province the valley also has marine lacustrine deposits of clay, basically of two kinds: a limestone and other non-calcareous.

The Haitises consist of a karst platform, which is composed of hard limestone from the Oligocene-Miocene. The highest elevations are generally 200 to 250 metres (656 to 820 ft)tall. The Payabo River crosses the region by a narrow channel filled with alluvial deposits.

The Northern Range is a mountain range of sedimentary rocks and highly faulted and folded fobáceas. In this province the Northern Range reaches heights of 942 metres (3,091 ft) (Quita Espuela); near San Francisco de Macorís the ridge height is slightly below 300 metres (984 ft). It presents some mudstone, limestone and Miocene and Eocene oligocénicos. To the south of Gaspar Hernandez and reaching the Nagua River there is a very complex area with rugged hills of limestone, and tuff, probably with other volcanic and metamorphic rocks, mainly of Upper Cretaceous.

=== Hydrography ===
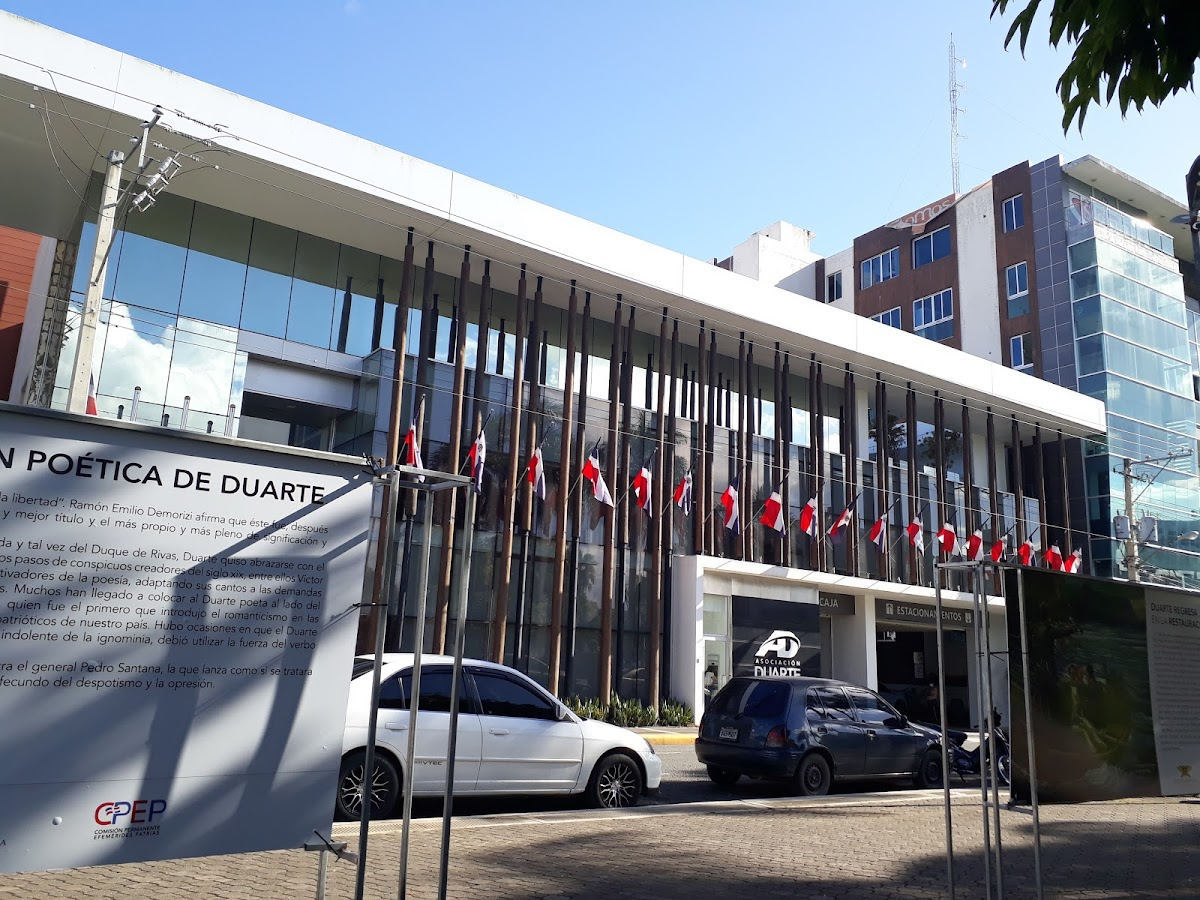
City bank

There are many rivers and streams in the Duarte Province, the most important ones being the Camú River, the Yuna River and their tributaries (Jaya, Cuaba, Nigua, Payabo, among others). The Yuna River and Camú River constitute important sources of water, both for drinking and for irrigation.

=== Physiography and environment ===
Environmental pollution in Duarte Province is the product of several elements, such as the poor state of latrines, untreated sewage, overflow of streams, indiscriminate use of agrochemicals, backwaters and installation of pigsties on the banks of rivers, and waste from some factories in the province that is thrown into rivers.

Soil erosion from deforestation also affects the environment of the Duarte Province. Similarly, the smoke from factories and from burning trash, specifically in the municipality of San Francisco de Macorís, is affecting its inhabitants.

=== Climate ===
Temperatures fluctuate between 17 and 32 °C (63 and 90 °F), with cooler temperatures affected by rainfall. It is largely an isolated paradise since much of the territory is unaffected by hurricanes or extremely hot weather. Occasional floods can occur due to a rainy season which manifests itself mostly during the month of May.

Climate data for San Francisco de Macorís (1961–1990)
| Month | Jan | Feb | Mar | Apr | May | Jun | Jul | Aug | Sep | Oct | Nov | Dec | Year |
|---|---|---|---|---|---|---|---|---|---|---|---|---|---|
| Record high °C (°F) | 37.2 (99.0) | 35.0 (95.0) | 36.5 (97.7) | 37.4 (99.3) | 37.5 (99.5) | 37.5 (99.5) | 38.0 (100.4) | 38.5 (101.3) | 39.5 (103.1) | 39.6 (103.3) | 38.5 (101.3) | 39.5 (103.1) | 39.6 (103.3) |
| Mean daily maximum °C (°F) | 28.3 (82.9) | 28.7 (83.7) | 29.6 (85.3) | 30.5 (86.9) | 30.9 (87.6) | 31.7 (89.1) | 31.9 (89.4) | 32.0 (89.6) | 32.2 (90.0) | 31.9 (89.4) | 29.9 (85.8) | 28.6 (83.5) | 30.5 (86.9) |
| Daily mean °C (°F) | 23.0 (73.4) | 23.1 (73.6) | 23.6 (74.5) | 24.6 (76.3) | 25.4 (77.7) | 26.2 (79.2) | 26.3 (79.3) | 26.3 (79.3) | 26.4 (79.5) | 26.0 (78.8) | 24.7 (76.5) | 23.5 (74.3) | 24.9 (76.9) |
| Mean daily minimum °C (°F) | 17.7 (63.9) | 17.4 (63.3) | 17.7 (63.9) | 18.7 (65.7) | 20.0 (68.0) | 20.6 (69.1) | 20.8 (69.4) | 20.6 (69.1) | 20.5 (68.9) | 20.1 (68.2) | 19.4 (66.9) | 18.4 (65.1) | 19.3 (66.8) |
| Record low °C (°F) | 12.2 (54.0) | 12.0 (53.6) | 10.2 (50.4) | 12.3 (54.1) | 14.0 (57.2) | 16.0 (60.8) | 12.9 (55.2) | 16.0 (60.8) | 16.4 (61.5) | 16.4 (61.5) | 15.0 (59.0) | 12.7 (54.9) | 10.2 (50.4) |
| Average rainfall mm (inches) | 82.1 (3.23) | 72.8 (2.87) | 59.4 (2.34) | 97.2 (3.83) | 192.6 (7.58) | 115.8 (4.56) | 125.8 (4.95) | 163.2 (6.43) | 121.8 (4.80) | 128.1 (5.04) | 173.6 (6.83) | 110.4 (4.35) | 1,448 (57.01) |
| Average rainy days (≥ 1.0 mm) | 8.8 | 7.2 | 8.2 | 8.0 | 12.6 | 9.7 | 12.2 | 12.0 | 9.5 | 9.9 | 12.6 | 11.0 | 120.5 |
Source: NOAA

== Places of interest ==
- Estadio Julian Javier
- Casa del Morris Quezada
- Parque Duarte
- Catedral de Santa ana

== The municipal building ==
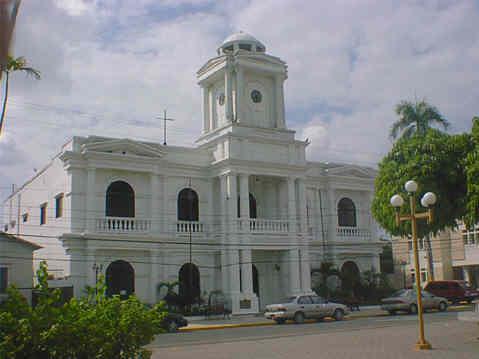
City hall of San Francisco de Macorís

The city hall of San Francisco de Macorís is the headquarters of the city council and city mayor.

== Santa Ana Cathedral ==
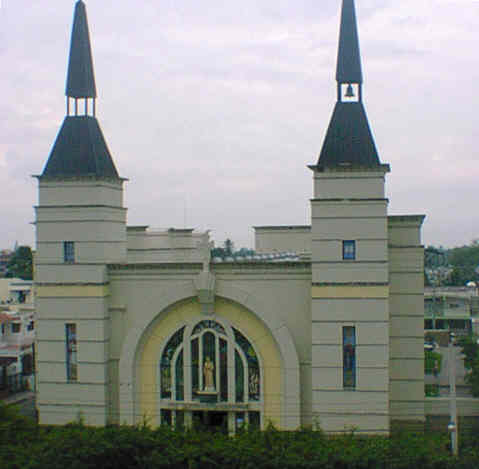
Santa Ana Cathedral

The Santa Ana Cathedral is a mixture of Gothic and modern architecture. It covers a complete city block, bound on the north by Santa Ana Street, on the south by Colon Street, on the west by Papi Olivier Street and on the east by Restauración Street. The Santa Ana Cathedral is the headquarters of Obispo de la Diócesis de San Francisco and home to the humanist Monseñor Jesús María de Jesús Moya.

== Communications ==
San Francisco de Macorís has several radio stations and publications. Its longest-running newspaper is El Jaya, which was founded on November 20, 1985. Its director and founder is the journalist Adriano Cruz Marte.

== Notable residents ==
- José Rafael Molina Ureña, 44th President of the Republic, 1965
- Francisco García, basketball player for the Sacramento Kings
- Julián Javier, baseball player
- Stan Javier, baseball player
- Eladio Romero Santos, music producer and singer
- Marino Vinicio Castillo, lawyer
- Pelegrín Castillo, politician
- Hilma Contreras, writer
- Jackeline Estévez, singer
- Victor Martinez, professional bodybuilder
- Don Miguelo, singer and writer
- Richard Ureña, baseball player
- Hanser Alberto, professional baseball player who most recently played for the Chicago White Sox
- Luis Kalaf, composer, musician
- Elio Rojas, world champion
- Marco Luciano, baseball player
- Johan Rojas, professional baseball player
