= Duarte Province =

Province of the Dominican Republic

Duarte
- Province
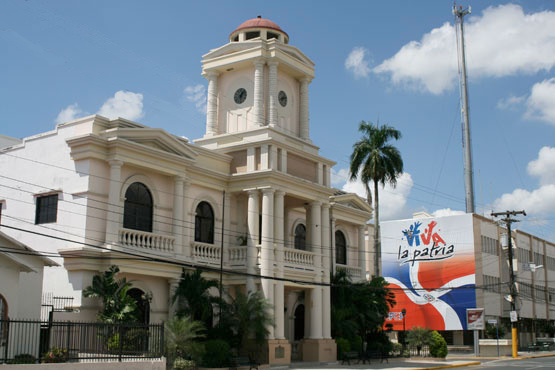
- Town Hall in San Francisco city, Duarte province, Dominican Republic

- Location of the Duarte Province
- Country: Dominican Republic
- Region: Cibao
- Province since: 1896
- Capital: San Francisco de Macorís

Government
  - Type: Subdivisions
  - Body: 7 municipalities 11 municipal districts
  - Congresspersons: 1 Senator; 6 Deputies

Area
  - Total: 1,605.35 km^{2} (619.83 sq mi)

Population (2014)
  - Total: 338,649
  - Density: 210.950/km^{2} (546.359/sq mi)
- Time zone: UTC-4 (EST)
- Area code: 1-809 1-829 1-849
- ISO 3166-2: DO-06
- Postal Code: 31000

Duarte (Spanish pronunciation: [ˈdwaɾte]) is a northeastern province which comprises one of the 32 provinces of the Dominican Republic. It is divided into 7 municipalities and its capital city is San Francisco de Macorís. It is bordered by the provinces of María Trinidad Sánchez and Samaná to the east, Monte Plata and Sánchez Ramírez to the south, La Vega and Hermanas Mirabal to the west and Espaillat to the north. It is named after Juan Pablo Duarte, the Father of the Nation of the Dominican Republic.

It was created in 1896 as a district (an old country subdivision) with the name Distrito Pacificador but the Constitution of 1907 changed the category to province. In 1925 its name was changed to Duarte.

== Geography ==
The province has a total area of 1,605.35 km^{2}. It has 3.3% of the area of the Dominican Republic and it is ranked as the 13th (out of 31 plus the National District) largest province.

== History ==
The province is named in honor of the country's founding father Juan Pablo Duarte. In the 18th century, a chapel for the Lady of Santa Ana was founded, built in what is now the Rincón San Francisco de Macorís. For the nineteenth century, it was admitted to the category of Parish to later become the District of La Vega. When the independence of the Dominican Republic was proclaimed, Duarte was the first town in the Cibao to rise up in favor of the Puerta del Conde. After the republic had been established, Duarte became a part of La Vega.

In 1896 San Francisco became the head of the Peacekeeping District —this name was given in honor of President Ulises Heureaux, who was given the title of Peacemaker of the Homeland. In 1907 it became a province with the same as Peacemaker. In 1925 the name of the Pacifying Province was changed to the Duarte Province, in honor of the Father of the nation.

== Municipalities ==
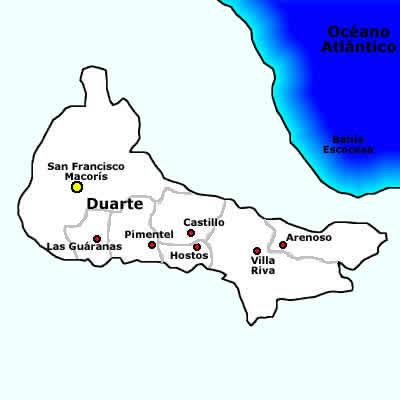
Municipalities of Duarte Province

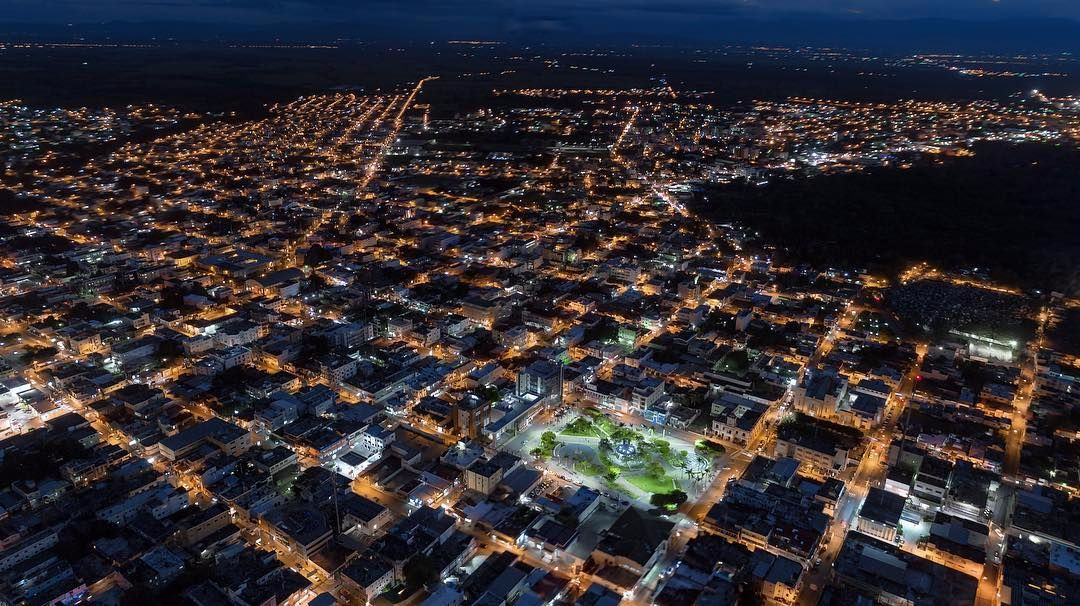
Center of San Francisco de Macoris

The province as of June 20, 2006 is divided into the following municipalities (municipios) and municipal districts (distrito municipal - D.M.) within them:

- San Francisco de Macorís, head municipality of the province
  - Cenoví (D.M.)
  - Jaya (D.M.)
  - La Peña (D.M.)
  - Presidente Don Antonio Guzmán Fernández (D.M.)
- Arenoso
  - El Aguacate (D.M.)
  - Las Coles (D.M.)
- Castillo
- Eugenio María de Hostos
  - Sabana Grande (D.M.)
- Las Guáranas
- Pimentel
- Villa Riva
  - Agua Santa del Yuna (D.M.)
  - Barraquito (D.M.)
  - Cristo Rey de Guaraguao (D.M.)
  - Guáranas Arriba (D.M.)

== Population ==
The following is a sortable table of the municipalities and municipal districts with population figures as of the 2014 estimate. Urban population are those living in the seats (cabeceras literally heads) of municipalities or of municipal districts. Rural population are those living in the districts (Secciones literally sections) and neighborhoods (Parajes literally places) outside them. The population figures are from the 2014 population estimate.

Name	Total population	Urban population	Rural population
Arenoso	15,122	2,895	12,227
Castillo	18,962	12,541	6,421
Eugenio Maria de Hostos	16,232	5,411	10,821
Las Guáranas	16,022	6,524	9,498
Pimentel	23,202	14,677	8,525
San Francisco de Macorís	213,906	155,132	58,774
Villa Riva	35,203	4,412	30,791
Duarte province	338,649	201,592	137,057

For comparison with the municipalities and municipal districts of other provinces see the list of municipalities and municipal districts of the Dominican Republic.
