= Christopher Hartley =

British-Spanish Catholic priest

Christopher Hartley (born 1959) is a British-Spanish Catholic missionary priest who worked from 1997 to 2006 to improve the working and living conditions of the Haitian sugar cane workers in San José de los Llanos in the province of San Pedro de Macorís, Dominican Republic. His work there was the subject of the documentary film The Price of Sugar (2007), produced and directed by Bill Haney.

== Early life and ministry ==
Christopher Hartley Sartorius was born in 1959. His father was a wealthy Englishman and an Anglican. His mother was a Spanish aristocrat. He decided to become a priest at the age of 15 and, though he was living in Madrid, chose to attend the more conservative and rigorous seminary in Toledo.

He was inspired by Mother Teresa and met her in London in 1977. He helped open one of her missions in Madrid and spent several summers working for her in Calcutta. He attached himself to the Archdiocese of New York, where he worked to promote vocations in the Spanish-speaking community.

He was ordained a priest by Pope John Paul II in Rome in 1982. He then worked for eight years in New York at several parishes in the Bronx. He earned his doctorate in theology at the Gregorian University in Rome from 1992 to 1995. Upon his return to NY, Cardinal John O'Connor, whom he considered a mentor and friend, named him pastor of St. Patrick's Old Cathedral parish.

== Dominican Republic ==
Hartley decided to return to missionary work rather than the clerical career O'Connor was planning for him in New York. The diocese of San Pedro de Macorís in Santo Domingo was very short of priests, so its bishop welcomed Hartley when O'Connor recommended him. His assignment to Santo Domingo as a priest of the NY Archdiocese was renewed for years.

In 2005, several newspapers in the Dominican Republic criticized Hartley's work on behalf of Haitian immigrants. The bishop of San Pedro de Macorís, Francisco Ozoria Acosta, expressed support for Hartley in a statement that said he had helped the sugar cane workers understand "they have dignity and rights" and given them the courage to demand their human rights. Ozoria warned Hartley's critics of opposing him out of a false sense of patriotism or because of racist attitudes toward the Haitian workers. He said that Hartley had "made it difficult to maintain the abusive work regimen they have been subjected to. This has affected the profits of some companies located in his area and that have benefited from the flagrant injustices."

His activist efforts to improve living and working conditions of Haitian immigrants brought him into confrontation with the Vicini family that owns the sugar plantations in San José de los Llanos, and one of the wealthiest and most influential families of the Dominican Republic.

=== Departure ===
After years of working in the Dominican Republic, Hartley began the process of incardination in the diocese of San Pedro de Macorís, that is, to change his status from that of a priest under the jurisdiction of the Archdiocese of New York to the jurisdiction of the diocese of San Pedro de Macorís. In late 2006, the bishop of that diocese, Francisco Ozoria Acosta, cut that process short, suspended Hartley from his pastoral assignments in his diocese, and ordered him to leave.

He cited an unspecified incident "and other serious violations", and said he acted after consulting other bishops. Hartey later claimed he left the Dominican Republic because of his father's poor health, and others speculated that he was removed because business interests and politicians opposed his social activism. Ozoria said the decision was his alone: "Father Hartley's departure from the Dominican Republic had nothing to do with the health of his father, who had been ill for some time. Neither was it the result of any pressure whatsoever from the Government of the Dominican Republic, Cardinal López Rodríguez, or the Vicini family for me to make the decision to relieve Father Hartley of his pastoral duties and ask him to leave the San Pedro de Macorís Diocese."

In a letter to Hartley dated 21 September 2006 Ozoria wrote that Hartley's "deplorable" actions hurt the church's work of pastoral care, produced a "serious detriment or disturbance to the ecclesiastical community", and made it impossible to establish the level of trust necessary between a bishop and a priest.

An account in the National Catholic Reporter of the events surrounding Hartley's departure concluded that Hartley had spoken with a minor Vatican official about a strategy for blocking the appointment of a bishop. It also said that Hartley had questioned whether Ozoria had authored the dismissal letter sent under his name.

In December 2006 he returned briefly to the Dominican Republic accompanying a delegation of U.S. congressmen who were assessing the living conditions of the Haitian migrants.

== Documentary film ==
A Massachusetts-based film production company, Uncommon Productions, produced a documentary that showed how Haitians were exploited by the sugar cane industry in the Dominican Republic, notably by the Vicini family. The film centered on Hartley's advocacy on behalf of Haitian migrant workers from 2004 to 2006.

In 2007, the Vicini family sued the filmmakers for defamation in U.S. District Court in an attempt to halt further distribution of the film on DVD. In the course of the lawsuit, Hartley denied under oath that he had been served a subpoena to appear to be deposed. An eyewitness, Joe Johns of CNN, contradicted Hartley and swore he saw the subpoena being served. On 21 July 2008 the Court ruled that Hartley had not established that he had not been properly served.

Judge Douglas P. Woodlock ruled for the filmmakers on 16 August 2010. He found they had not recklessly included material that was blatantly false, the standard for defamation.

According to the Haitian newspaper Le Nouvelliste, the law firm Patton Boggs of Washington, D.C., which works for the Vicini family, tried to interfere with the distribution of the movie in France. The newspaper said the Vicini family hired the public relations firm Newlink Communications of Miami, owned by Sergio Roitberg who specializes in reputation management, to protect Vicini business interests in the United States where most Dominican sugar is sold.

Members of the House of Representatives of the Dominican Republic passed "a resolution denouncing Hartley and [Father Pedro] Ruquoy". in 2007, and in 2009 maintained that the film The Price of Sugar was part of "a smear campaign" against the Dominican Republic.

== Campaigning from exile and alleged conflict of interest ==
From Europe, Hartley has continued to campaign for Haitian worker rights in the Dominican Republic; meanwhile he remains vilified in that country, with critics claiming he preaches "a gospel of hate". He also helped draft the Better Sugarcane Initiative which encourages fair trade for sugar. In a letter to the directors of Tate & Lyle dated 10 July 2009 he asserted that human rights violations continue in the Dominican Republic, which include "daily and systematic disregard for fundamental human dignity in the forms of “statelessness” (and its inherent lack of civil liberties), human trafficking, extreme poverty, child labor, racial discrimination, lack of education and healthcare, and general squalor. The laundry list goes on and is further compounded during this harvest season (2008–2009) by new variations, which include: 1) failure to withhold social security (IDSS) contributions, leaving workers without basic benefits; 2) preservation of sub-standard, poverty-level wages; 3) new forms of fraud in the weighing of, and remuneration for, cut cane; 4) resurgence in trafficking of human persons (after a hiatus of approximately three years); 5) deprivation of entitled healthcare benefits; 6) arbitrary terminations and denial of earned benefits; and, 7) refusal to issue written contracts guaranteed under Dominican law."

In April 2012, Minister of Industry and Commerce of the Dominican Republic, Manuel Garcia Arévalo said that Hartley's advocacy against the sugar industry in the Dominican Republic was based on his relations with sugar interests in Europe because he has family ties to executives of the London-based, employee-owned food trading company ED&F Man España SA, which deals in sugar and other commodities through Rafael Fernando Muguiro Sartorius, the CEO of the company, a cousin, and William Alexander Hartley Sartorius, a member of the board, his brother.

== Later career ==
Upon his departure from Santo Domingo, he returned to New York, where he no longer had close ties since his mentor O'Connor had died in 2000. He attached himself to the archdiocese of Toledo, Spain, in August 2007 he was assigned to a mission in Ethiopia. In June 2018 he ended his mission in Gode, Ethiopia. Currently he is on the mission in the state of Guerrero in Mexico.

== In fiction ==
Carlos Agramonte, a professor of engineering at the Autonomous University of Santo Domingo, authored a novel called El sacerdote inglés (The English Priest), which denounces slavery in the sugar cane industry by combining an account of Hartley's work with a fictional romance between a member of a sugar-controlling dynasty and a Haitian doctor. After its publication in January 2009, Agramonte said he was harassed and planned to leave the Dominican Republic.
