= Nicolás de Jesús López Rodríguez =

Dominican cardinal (born 1936)

His Eminence Nicolás de Jesús López Rodríguez
- Cardinal, Archbishop Emeritus of Santo Domingo; Primate Emeritus of the Indies
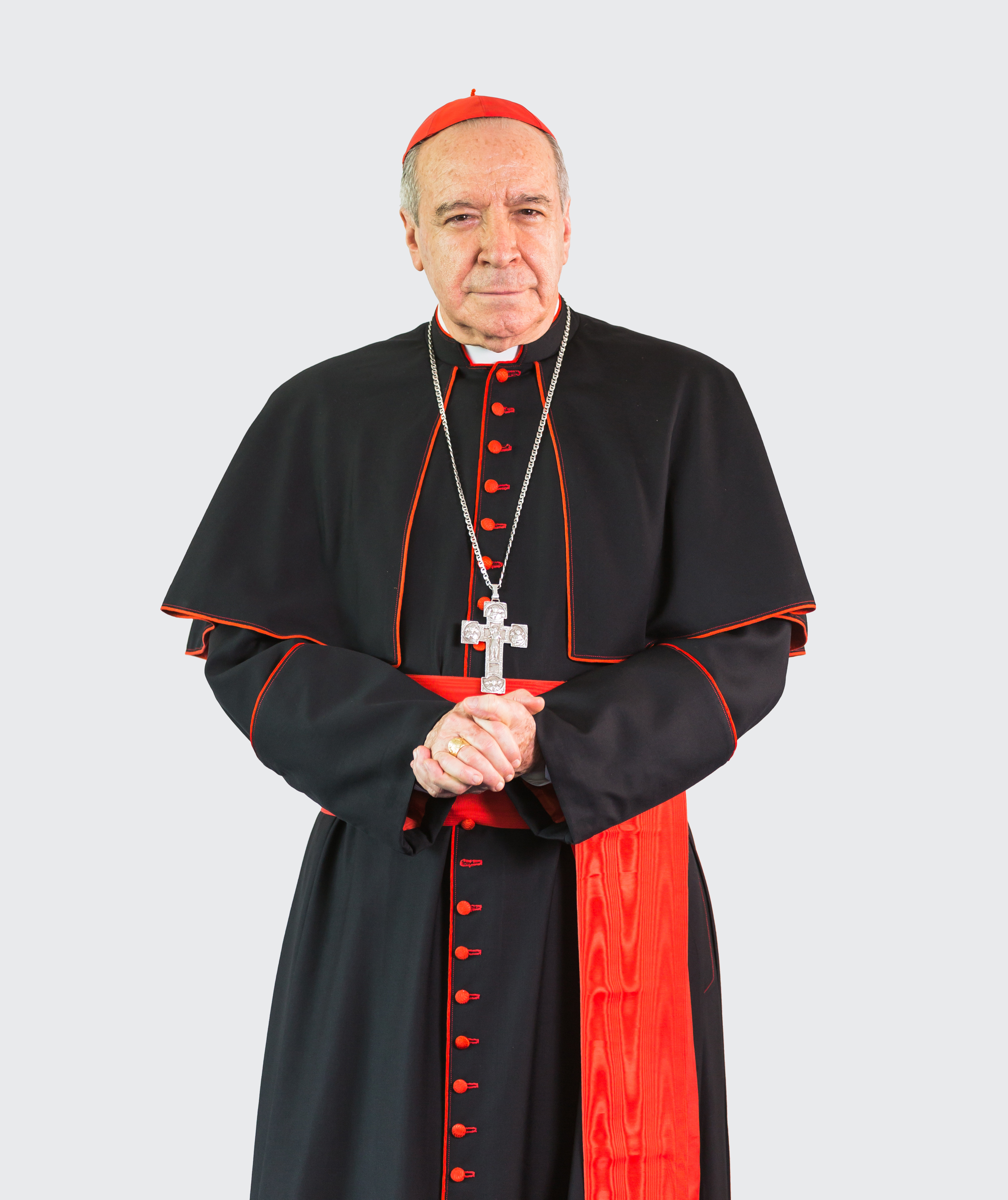
- Archdiocese: Santo Domingo
- Province: Santo Domingo
- Appointed: 15 November 1981
- Term ended: 4 July 2016
- Predecessor: Octavio Antonio Beras Rojas
- Successor: Francisco Ozoria Acosta
- Other post: Cardinal-Priest of San Pio X alla Balduina (1991–)
- Previous posts: Bishop of San Francisco de Macorís (1978–81); Military Vicar of the Dominican Republic (1982–86); President of the Dominican Episcopal Conference (1984–2002); Military Ordinary of the Dominican Republic (1986–2017); President of the Dominican Episcopal Conference (2009-14)

Orders
- Ordination: 18 March 1961 by Francisco Panal Ramírez
- Consecration: 25 February 1978 by Octavio Antonio Beras Rojas
- Created cardinal: 28 June 1991 by Pope John Paul II
- Rank: Cardinal-Priest

Personal details
- Born: Nicolás de Jesús López Rodríguez; 31 October 1936 (age 90) Barranca, La Vega, Dominican Republic
- Denomination: Catholic (Roman Rite)
- Education: Pontifical University of Saint Thomas Aquinas
- Motto: Fortes in fide
- Signature: Nicolás de Jesús López Rodríguez's signature

- Coat of arms: Nicolás de Jesús López Rodríguez's coat of arms

Styles of Nicolás de Jesús López Rodríguez
- Reference style: His Eminence
- Spoken style: Your Eminence
- Informal style: Cardinal
- See: Santo Domingo

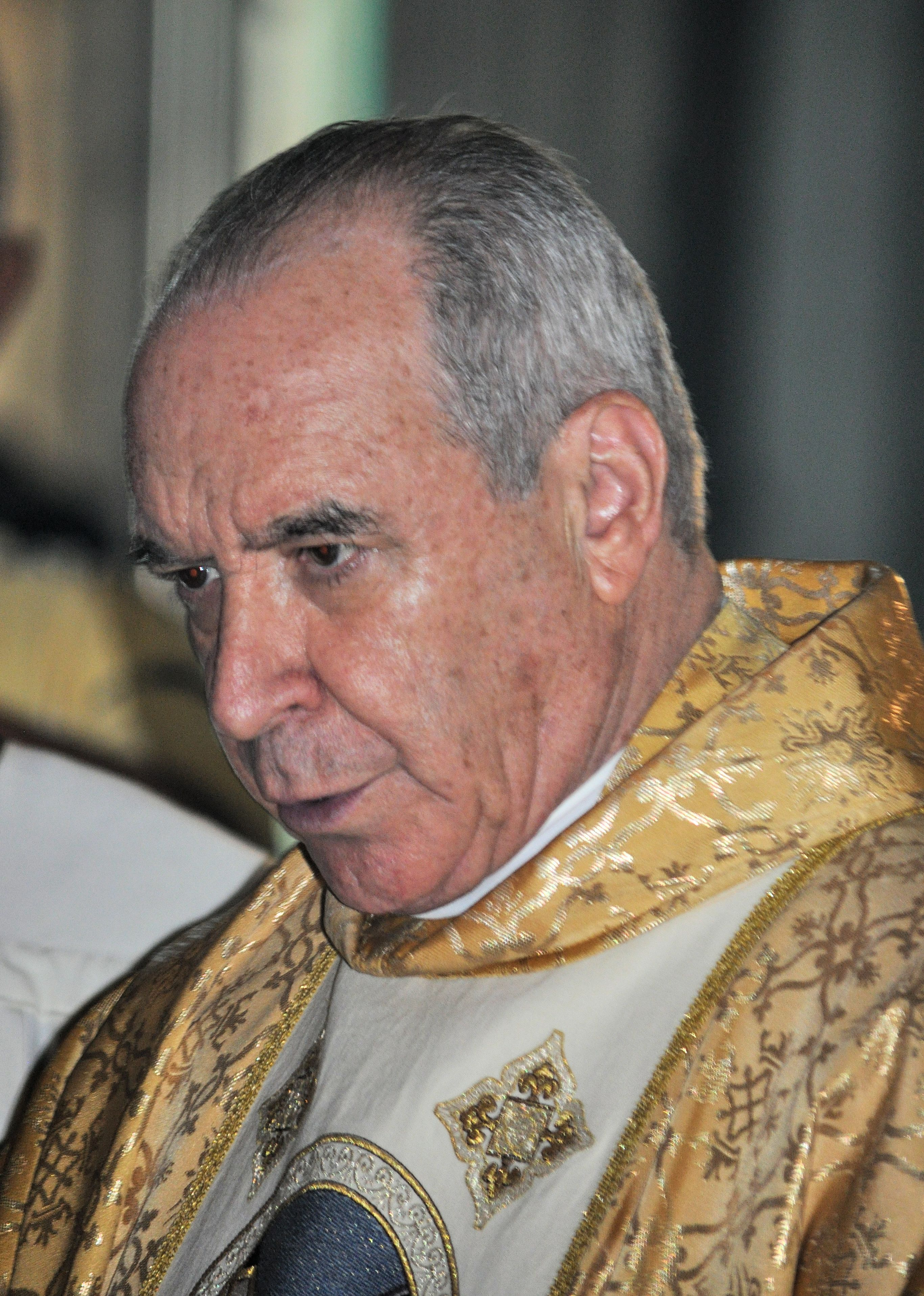
Cardinal López during the Easter mass in 2013

Nicolás de Jesús López Rodríguez (Latin American Spanish pronunciation: [nikoˈlas ðe xeˈsus ˈlopes roˈðɾiɣes]; born 31 October 1936) is a Dominican Catholic prelate who served as Archbishop of Santo Domingo from 1981 to 2016. He was made a cardinal in 1991.

== Early years ==
He was ordained on 18 March 1961 by Francisco Panal Ramírez OFM, bishop of La Vega. He served as Vicar cooperator of the cathedral of La Vega, 1961–1963. Further studies in Rome, 1963–1965. Chancellor and secretary of the diocesan curia of La Vega, 1966–1968. Further studies, Rome, 1968–1969. In the diocese of La Vega, 1969–1978, diocesan assessor for the pastoral of the youth and pastor of the cathedral, 1969–1970. Vicar for the pastoral and pro-vicar general, 1970–1976. Vicar general, 1976–1978.

At the Pontifical University of St. Thomas Aquinas Angelicum he earned a licentiate in social science in 1965.

Besides his native Spanish, he speaks Italian, English, German, Portuguese and Latin.

== Episcopate ==
He was appointed bishop of San Francisco de Macorís on 16 January 1978 by Pope Paul VI and was consecrated on 25 February 1978 by Cardinal Octavio Antonio Beras Rojas, archbishop of Santo Domingo, assisted by Juan Antonio Flores Santana, bishop of La Vega, and by Jesús María De Jesús Moya, auxiliary of Santiago de los Caballeros. He served as rector of the University of San Francisco de Macorís from 1979 to 1984. He was promoted to the metropolitan and primatial see of Santo Domingo on 15 November 1981. He was elected president of the Conference of the Dominican Episcopate in July 1984 and served as President of the Latin American Episcopal Council from 25 April 1991 to 1994. He was created Cardinal and assigned the titular church of San Pio X alla Balduina in the consistory of 28 June 1991.

He participated as cardinal elector in the papal conclaves of 2005 and 2013. When he reached age 80 in 2016, he became a non-elector.

He held the title of "Primate of the Indies", because the diocese of Santo Domingo was the first erected in the New World.

Pope Francis accepted his resignation on 4 July 2016, naming Francisco Ozoria Acosta, Bishop of San Pedro de Macorís, to succeed him. At the time his resignation was accepted, Lopez Rodríguez had rarely been seen in public for several months. He broke his silence early in September by writing an open letter apologizing to anyone he had offended while Archbishop. He said he felt no bitterness toward those who disagreed with him and professed joy at his successor's appointment.

Ozoria Acosta also succeeded Lopez Rodriguez as Ordinary of the Military Bishopric of Dominican Republic on 2 January 2017.

== Views ==
López Rodríguez organized a meeting of the Latin American bishops held in Santo Domingo in 1992, which was a showcase for his very traditional views, described as "temporalist and pyramidal" by veteran Vatican observer Giancarlo Zizola. He tends to support the integralist view that the organic relationship of social classes supersedes social differentiation and social conflicts. He has advocated adding the Catholic feast of the Annunciation, 25 March, to the national holidays celebrated in the Dominican Republic.

=== Recall of nuncio accused of sexual abuse ===
In July 2013, López Rodríguez reported to Pope Francis personally that the papal nuncio to the Dominican Republic was rumored to have engaged in the sexual abuse of minors, which resulted in the nuncio's recall. He continued for several weeks to praise the nuncio, Józef Wesołowski, in public and say that his recall was routine. By the second week of September he asked the civil authorities to investigate the matter with "determination".

=== Homosexuality ===
During a 27 June 2013 interview, responding to a question about Barack Obama's appointment of Wally Brewster, an openly gay man, as U.S. ambassador to the Dominican Republic (D.R.), Lopez Rodriguez expressed his opposition to the appointment of a homosexual ambassador and said it was an attempt to promote the approval of same-sex marriages in the D.R. Moments later, when asked about problems between Haiti and the D.R. resulting from Haiti's claim that bird flu could be found in the D.R., Cardinal López Rodríguez laughed and said: "After talking about faggots and lesbians, now we'll talk about chickens". In the Dominican Republic, the word pájaro (bird) is used to refer pejoratively to a male homosexual.

In June 2014, after Brewster and his husband released a video promoting the celebration of June as Gay Pride Month, Lopez Rodriguez said "Diplomacy is not for that sort of thing, an absolutely negative propaganda" and that Brewster should "take his gay pride elsewhere". In December 2015, a week after Brewster criticized corruption in the Dominican Republic, Lopez Rodriguez said "That man [Brewster] needs to go back to his embassy. Let him focus on housework, since he's the wife to a man." These remarks were criticised by the US State Department. US Senator Dick Durbin asked Pope Francis to ask Rodriguez to treat Brewster with respect, citing the Pope's comments on the need to respect the dignity of all.

Catholic Church titles
Diocese created	Bishop of San Francisco de Macorís; 16 January 1978 – 15 November 1981	Succeeded by Jesús María de Jesús Moya
Preceded by Octavio Beras Rojas	Archbishop of Santo Domingo; 15 November 1981 – 4 July 2016	Succeeded by Francisco Ozoria Acosta
Preceded by Octavio Beras Rojas	Military Ordinary of the Dominican Republic; 4 April 1982 – 2 January 2017	Succeeded by Francisco Ozoria Acosta
Preceded by Felipe Santiago Benítez Avalos	First Vice-President of the Latin American Episcopal Council; 1987 – 1991	Succeeded by Juan Jesús Posadas Ocampo
Preceded by Darío Castrillón Hoyos	President of the Latin American Episcopal Council; 1991 – 1995	Succeeded by Óscar Andrés Rodríguez Maradiaga
Preceded by John Francis Dearden	Cardinal Priest of San Pio X alla Balduina; 28 June 1991 –	Incumbent
