= San Pio X alla Balduina =

- Church of Pope Saint Pius X in Balduina
- Chiesa di San Pio Decimo alla Balduina
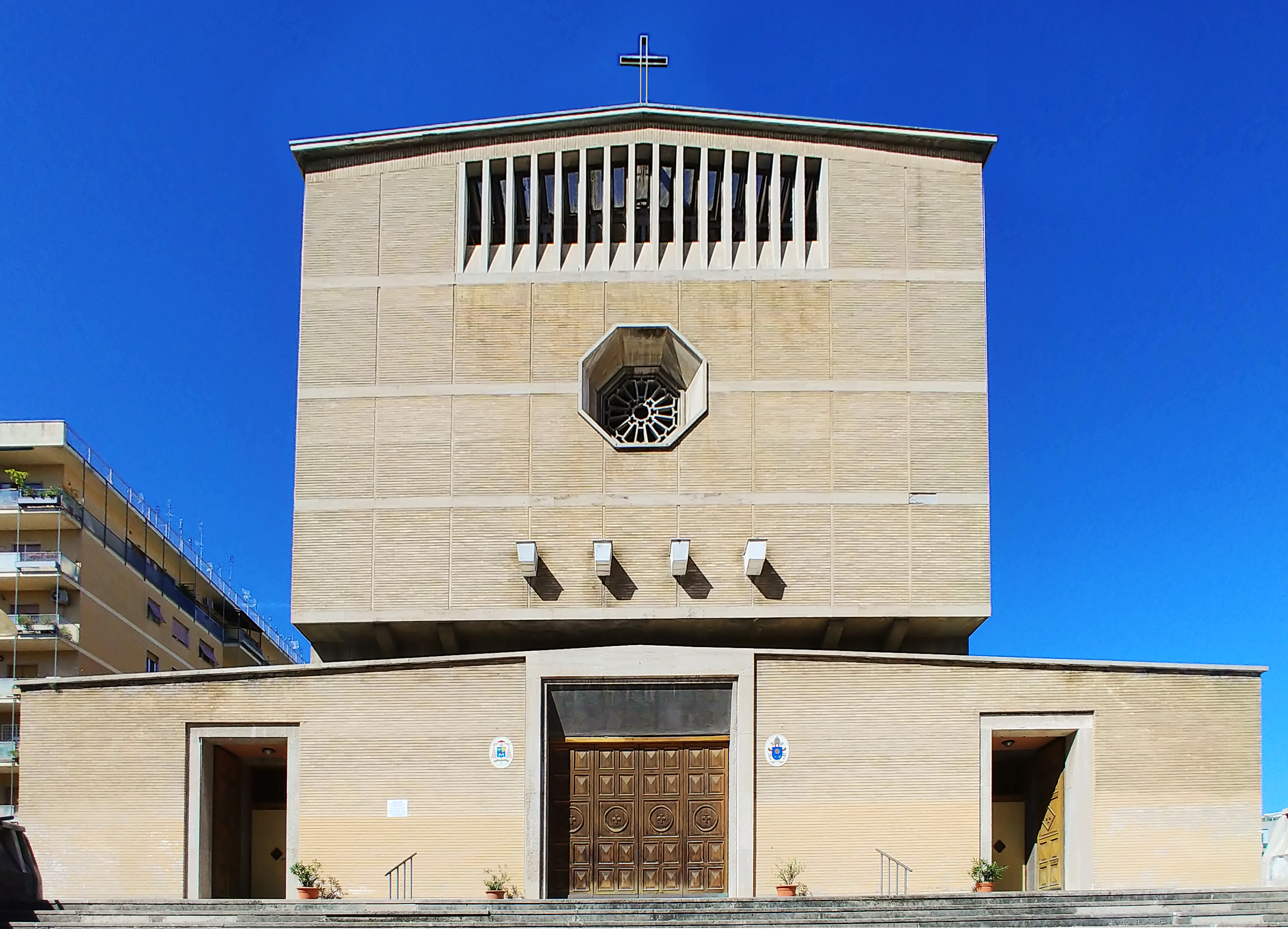
- Click on the map for a fullscreen view
- 41°55′11″N 12°26′27″E
- Location: Via Attilio Friggeri 87, Trionfale, Rome
- Country: Italy
- Language: Italian
- Denomination: Catholic
- Tradition: Roman Rite
- Website: sanpiodecimo.it

History
- Status: titular church
- Dedication: Pope Pius X
- Consecrated: 1961

Architecture
- Architect: Alberto Ressa
- Architectural type: Modern
- Groundbreaking: 1957
- Completed: 1961

Administration
- Diocese: Rome

San Pio X alla Balduina is a 20th-century parochial church and titular church in Rome, dedicated to Pope Pius X.

== History ==
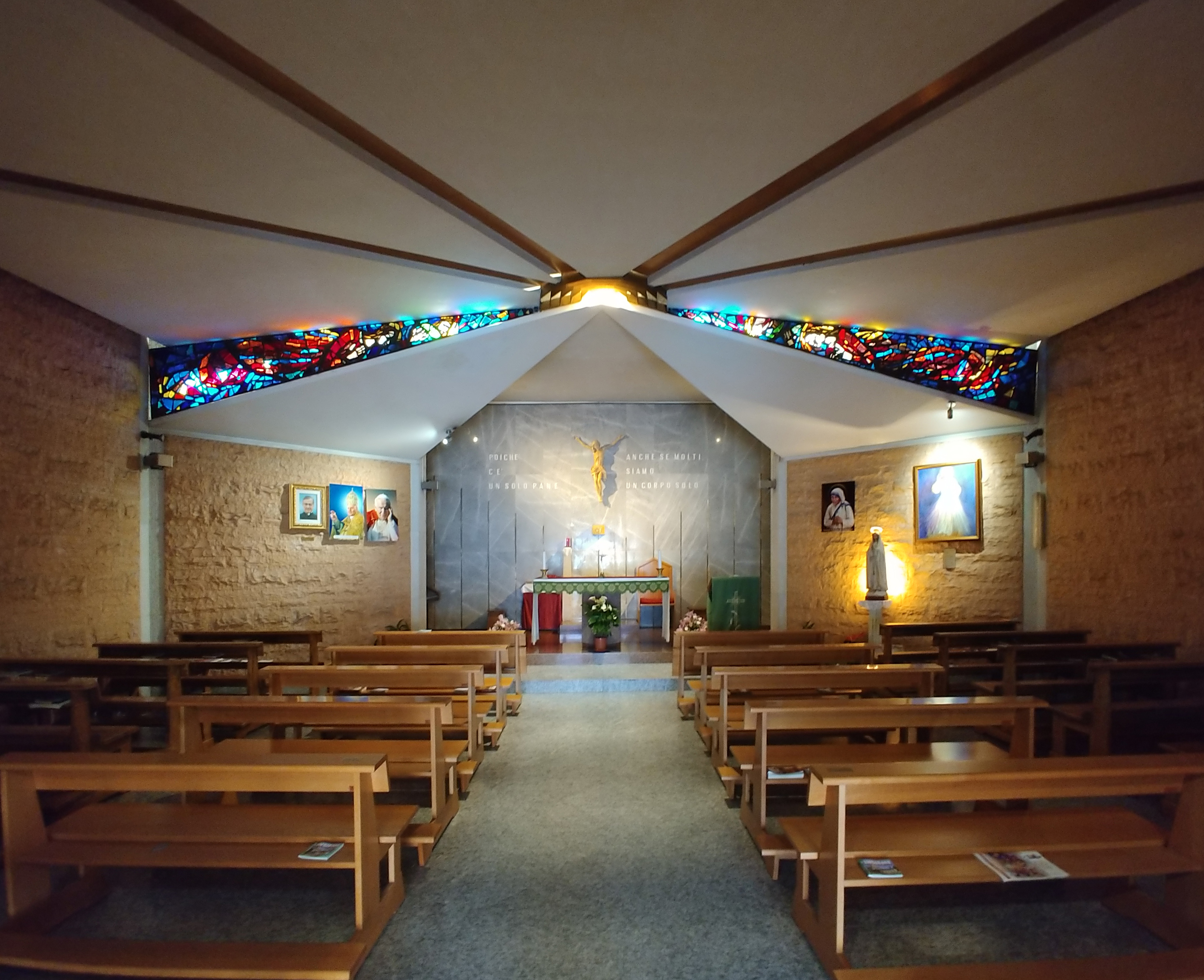
Crypt

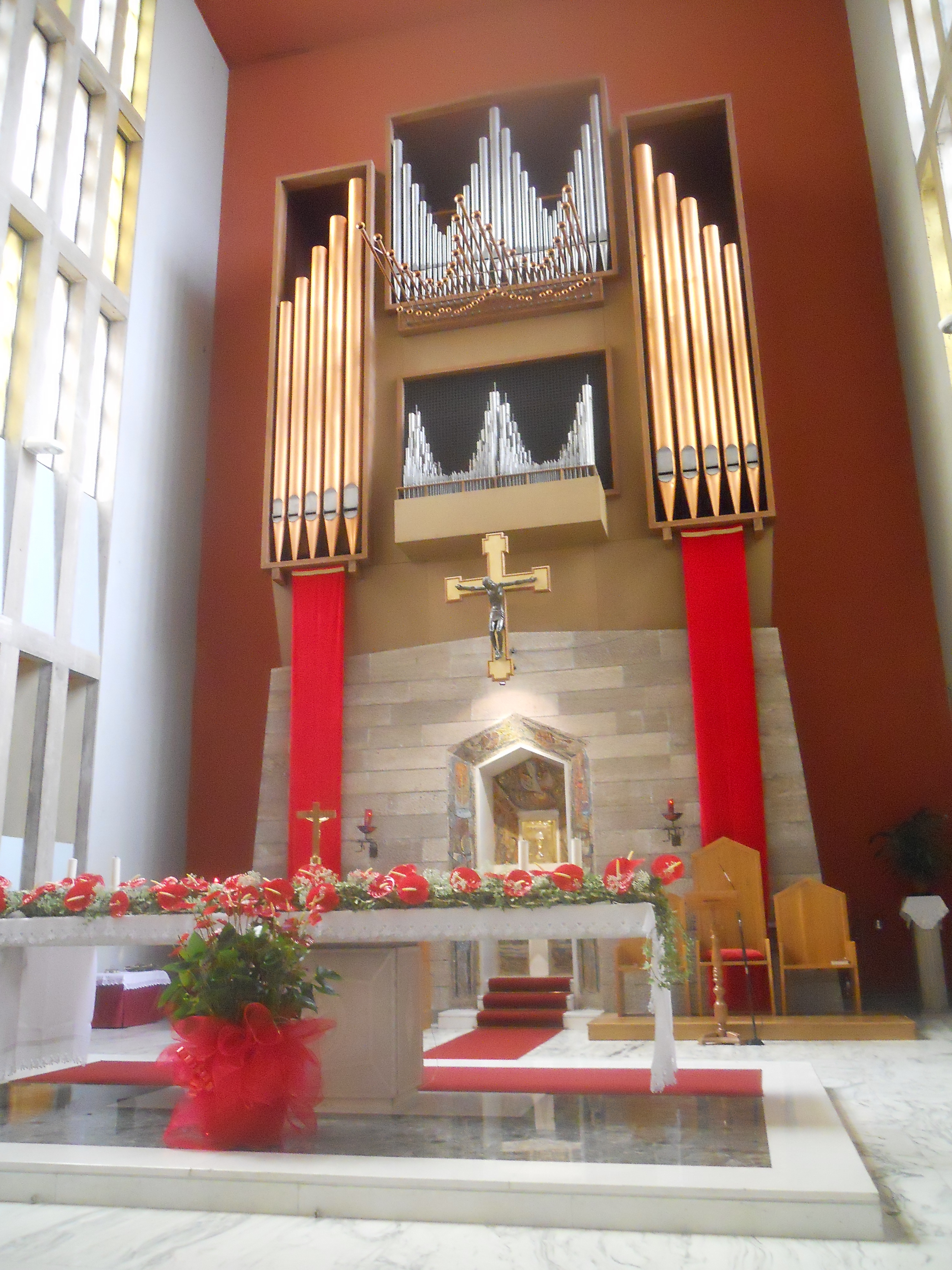
Altar and pipe organ

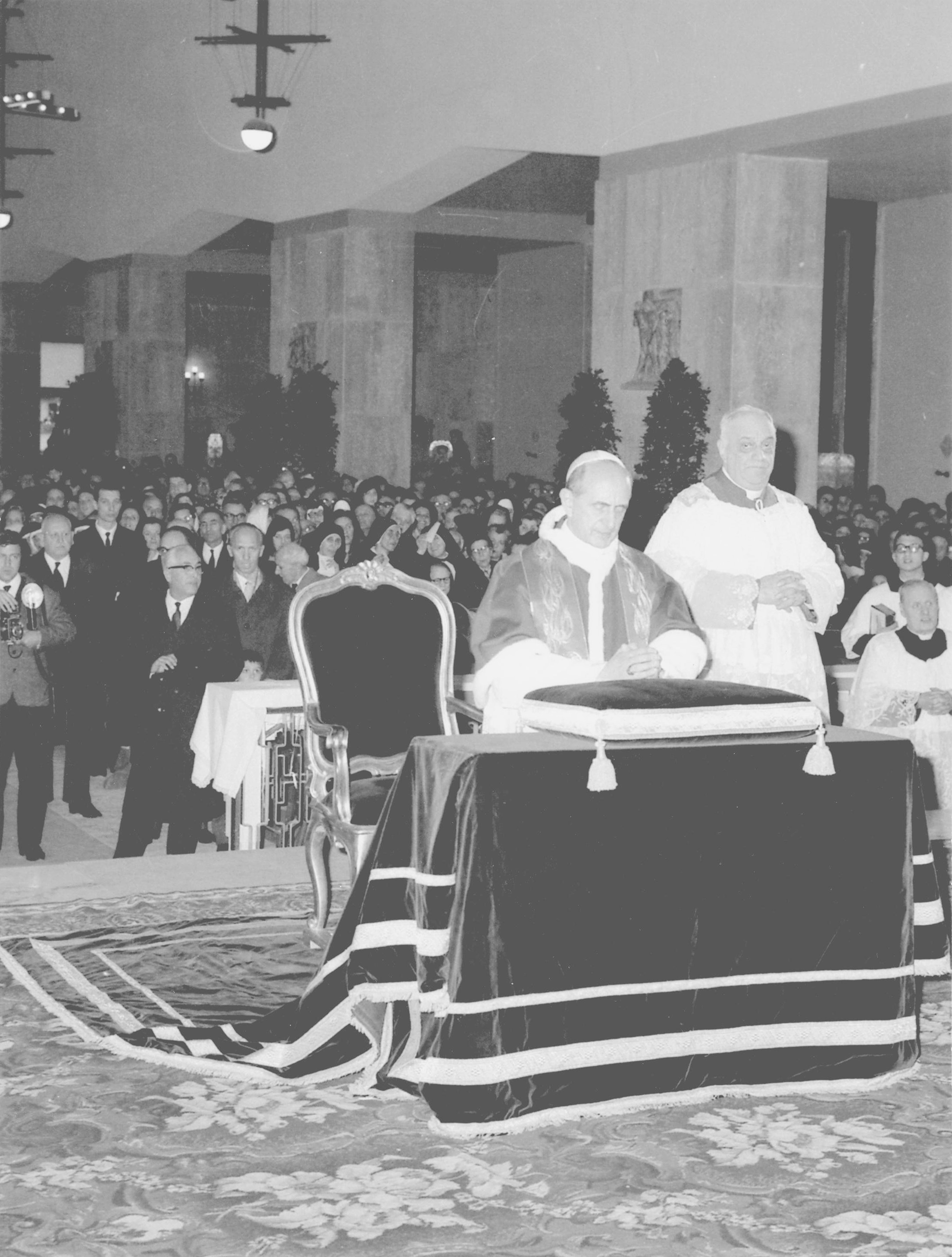
Visit of Pope Paul VI

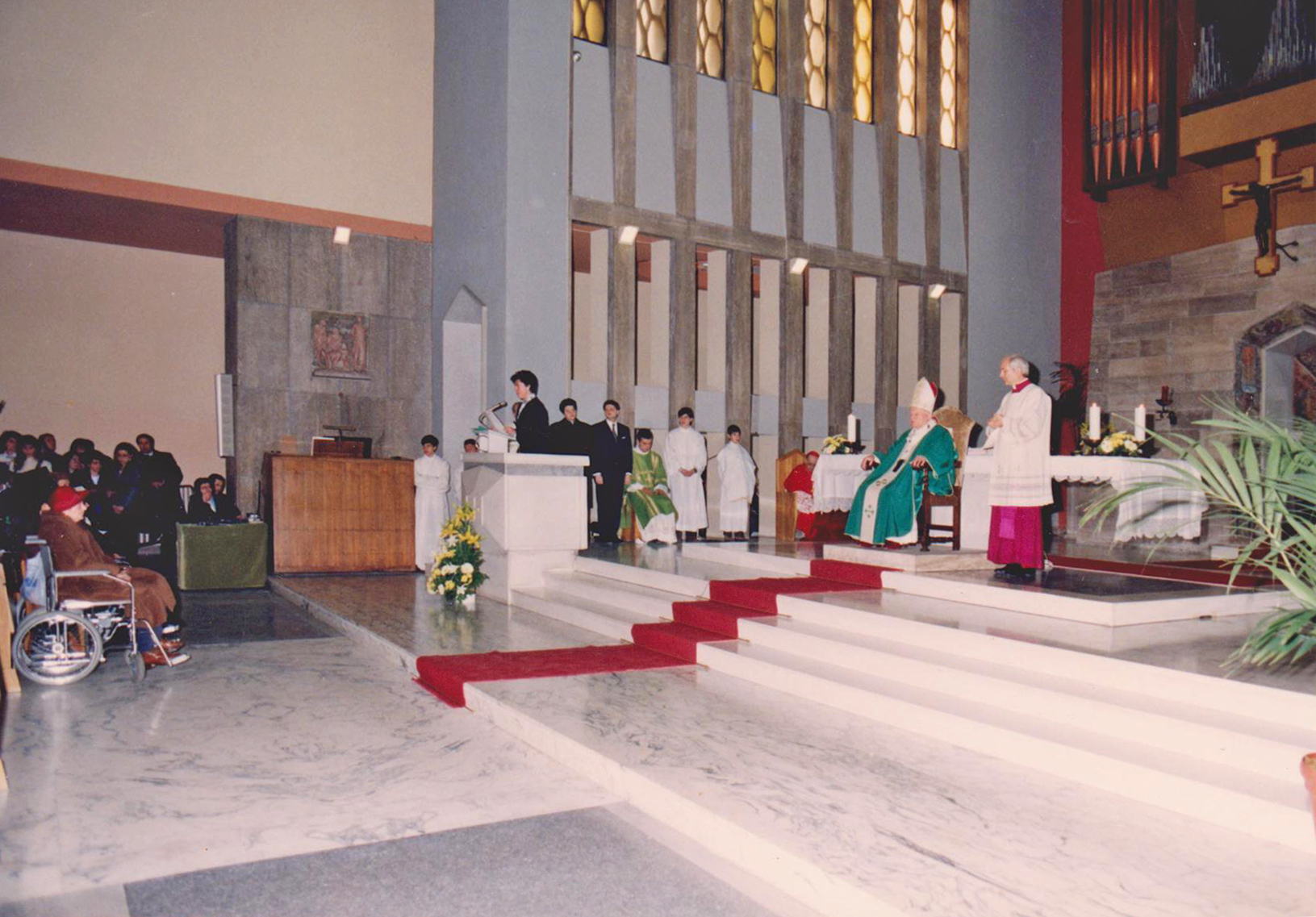
Visit of Pope John Paul II

The church was built in 1957–61. Pope Paul VI visited on 16 February 1964, and Pope John Paul II visited on 31 January 1993.

San Pio X was a filming site for The Last Man on Earth (1964); it was used for the climactic scene where Dr. Morgan (Vincent Price) is cornered by human-vampire hybrids and murdered on the altar of the church.

On 29 April 1969, it was made a titular church to be held by a cardinal-priest.

Cardinal-protectors

- John Dearden (1969–1988)
- Nicolás de Jesús López Rodríguez (1991–present)

== Architecture and art ==
The church is modernist in style, with a side chapel devoted to Padre Pio, with a painting of him by Ulisse Sartini. The main altar features a bronze crucifix by Publio Morbiducci, while the pipe organ (added in 1969, and so not seen in The Last Man on Earth) was made by the Tamburini firm.
