= The Price of Sugar (2007 film) =

- Poster
- Directed by: Bill Haney
- Produced by: Bill Haney; Eric Grunebaum
- Starring: Christopher Hartley
- Narrated by: Paul Newman
- Cinematography: Eric Cochran; Jerry Risius
- Edited by: Peter Rhodes
- Music by: Claudio Ragazzi
- Production company: Uncommon Productions
- Distributed by: Mitropoulos Films; Louise Rosen
- Release date: March 11, 2007 (US)
- Running time: 90 minutes
- Countries: United States; Dominican Republic
- Languages: English; Spanish; Haitian Creole

The Price of Sugar is a 2007 Uncommon Productions film directed by Bill Haney and produced by Haney and Eric Grunebaum about exploitation of Haitian immigrants in the Dominican Republic involved with production of sugar, and the efforts of Spanish priest Father Christopher Hartley to ameliorate their situation. It is narrated by actor Paul Newman. The documentary shows the poor working conditions in the sugar cane plantations, and political control exerted by the Vicini family to stifle efforts to change the situation.

While the documentary highlights the efforts of Father Christopher Hartley to bring medicine, education, and human rights to Haitian workers, it also shows the widespread resentment of his actions held by Dominican people.

== Critical reception ==
The documentary won the audience award at the 2007 South by Southwest Film Festival and the Amnesty International Award at the 2008 Thessaloniki Documentary Festival.

On November 19, 2007, The Price of Sugar was named by the Academy of Motion Picture Arts and Sciences as one of 15 films on its documentary feature Oscar shortlist.

The documentary did not make the nomination list for the Oscar Documentary Feature category.

On review aggregator website Rotten Tomatoes, the film holds an approval rating of 74% based on 19 reviews, with an average rating of 7.1/10.

== Defamation lawsuit ==
Subjects of the film, Felipe and Juan Vicini Lluberes, filed a defamation suit on August 31, 2007, against Uncommon Productions and producer Bill Haney, alleging 53 factual inaccuracies. According to Read McCaffrey, a partner in the law firm Patton Boggs representing the Vicinis,'The misrepresentation are very egregious and as deceptive as I have seen in a very long time.'" However, according to the First Circuit Court of Appeals, the Vicini family "later winnowed the number of allegedly defamatory statements down to seven". The Appeals Court upheld a judgment from a lower court that the Vicini brothers were "public figures under the circumstances". The brothers thus must prove that the filmmakers made false depictions and knew about it. If they had been private figures, as the plaintiffs had unsuccessfully tried to prove, the filmmakers could have been liable for publishing information without verifying its truth. The appeals court sent the case back to the lower court to decide if the filmmakers have to hand over a report that they prepared to obtain insurance coverage for the film. After that, the lower court can determine whether information shown in the film was false and, if it was the case, if the filmmakers knew about it. On August 16, 2010, U.S. District Judge Douglas P. Woodlock in Massachusetts ruled in favor of the filmmakers.

== Improvement of living conditions ==
According to a report by NPR, the living conditions of Haitian workers depicted in the film have improved to some extent soon after the film. New houses with electricity and water have been built together with rural clinics. The guards no longer carry guns, and the Haitians can leave the plantation.

More recent service workers from the U.S. who have traveled to the La Romana region of the Dominican Republic to partner with the Good Samaritan Hospital in providing relief efforts to the bateyes report different findings. In the network of more than 200 bateyes around La Romana, more than 50% have undrinkable water. Most do not have electricity. Guards are often seen with firearms. While Haitians are allowed to leave the plantations, they lack the financial resources and/or relationships to do so. Malnutrition and dehydration are the number one causes of death among children.

== See also ==
- Uncommon Productions
