= Richard Carthew =

American biologist

Richard W. Carthew
- Born: 5 September 1956 (age 70); Toronto, Ontario, Canada
- Education: Massachusetts Institute of Technology
- Scientific career
- Fields: Biology
- Workplaces: Northwestern University
- Thesis: Characterization of human Class II transcription factors (1987)
- Doctoral advisor: Phillip A. Sharp
- Website: sites.northwestern.edu/carthewlab/

Richard William Carthew (born 5 September 1956) is a developmental biologist and quantitative biologist at Northwestern University. He is a professor of molecular biosciences and is the director of the NSF-Simons Center for Quantitative Biology.

== Education and early career ==
Carthew received his B.Sc. degree in biology from Queen's University in 1978. There, he pursued his interests in ecology by conducting research under the supervision of Ted Brown on the environmental adaptation of cyanobacteria. Carthew continued his studies at University of Toronto, where he received a M.Sc. degree in botany with Johann Hellebust. concurrently, he undertook training in music composition at the Royal Conservatory of Music in Toronto.

Upon completing of his degree, Carthew worked for two years as a research technician under the supervision of Jack Greenblatt at the Banting and Best Department of Medical Research in Toronto. During this time, he studied the biochemistry of eukaryotic gene transcription and decided to forgo a career in music for one in the biomedical sciences. In 1982, Carthew began his PhD studies at the Massachusetts Institute of Technology where he conducted his thesis research in the lab of Phillip A. Sharp. During his doctoral studies, Carthew transformed the Electrophoresis Mobility Shift Assay (EMSA) into an assay capable of detecting sequence-specific DNA-binding proteins from crude cell extracts. Using this method, he identified and studied the HeLa cell transcription factor USF and its role in regulating gene transcription. Carthew also played a role in popularizing the now-common use in the biomedical literature of having multiple authors of a paper as "co-first authors". Carthew and fellow graduate student Lewis Chodosh decided to adopt this mechanism for their joint publication in Cell, inspired by its use by Andrew Fire and Mark Samuels. This novel feature of their paper was noticed by many, and subsequently adopted in other papers.

Following his graduate work, Carthew pursued post-doctoral research at the University of California Berkeley as a Helen Hay Whitney fellow. Carthew worked under the direction of Gerald M. Rubin on the molecular mechanisms of compound eye development in Drosophila melanogaster. He showed that the RING finger domain protein Seven in Absentia is essential for multipotent eye cells to adopt an R7 photoreceptor cell fate. In subsequent work, he showed that Seven in Absentia is activated by the Ras signal transduction pathway and acts as an E3 ubiquitin ligase to rapidly degrade a transcriptional repressor of R7 cell differentiation.

== Faculty career ==
Carthew started his independent research group in 1992 at the University of Pittsburgh in the Department of Biological Sciences. He became a tenured associate professor in 1998 and full professor in 2001. In 2001, Carthew moved to Northwestern University and became a full professor in the Department of Molecular Biosciences, which is located on the Evanston campus. He was appointed the Owen L. Coon Professor of Molecular Biology in 2006. Carthew served as leader of the Chromatin and Nuclear Dynamics Program in Northwestern’s Robert H. Lurie Comprehensive Cancer Center from 2012 to 2018. He served as director of the NCI funded Oncogenesis and Developmental Biology Training Program from 2007 to 2014. He currently serves as director of the NIGMS funded Training Program in Cellular and Molecular Basis of Disease at Northwestern.

In the early phase of Carthew lab research, a number of firsts were achieved. The Carthew group was the first to establish the Drosophila eye as a model system to study planar cell polarity. It was the first group to use Drosophila as a disease model to screen and test small molecule drugs for potential efficacy in disease treatment. It was the first group to provide genetic evidence that Frizzled proteins were Wnt receptors in vivo. In 1998, the group discovered that Drosophila were capable of RNAi or RNA interference. The labs of Andrew Fire and Craig Mello had just demonstrated a key role for double-stranded RNA as the trigger for RNAi in the nematode Caenorhabditis elegans, a discovery culminating in a Nobel Prize for Fire and Mello in 2006. By showing that RNAi also existed in another animal species, the Carthew group stimulated the search for RNAi in mammals, as well as the adoption of Drosophila as a premier model to study the biochemical and genetic mechanisms of RNAi. The Carthew group also developed the first and second generations of transgene systems for performing RNAi against any Drosophila gene at any stage of the life cycle in a tissue- or cell-specific manner. The second generation system was later expanded into a genome-wide collection of transgenic lines targeting all annotated genes. The Carthew lab has continued pursuing the mechanisms and functions of the small non-coding RNA world that was first glimpsed through the lens of RNAi. The group has been addressing how and why small interfering RNAs (siRNAs) and microRNAs (miRNAs) regulate gene expression.

Since 2004, the Carthew group has also pursued questions related to quantitative issues of development. Inspired by the mathematical biologist D'Arcy Thompson and his seminal book On Growth and Form, the group showed that the topology of epithelial cells in the Drosophila eye is constrained due to a tendency for the cells to minimize surface energy. This pioneering work emerged at the same time as other groups around the world also began addressing physical aspects of morphogenesis. Recent work in the Carthew lab has turned to dynamical features of gene expression as cells undergo lineage restriction during development. This work has focused on the importance of time as a dimension in animal development and how gene regulatory networks are designed to provide temporal flexibility to development. The Carthew group found that when developmental tempo is slowed down by limiting cell metabolism, gene repressors become redundant during lineage restriction, and the entire microRNA family is rendered non-essential for development in general.

== NSF-Simons Center for Quantitative Biology ==
In July 2018, Carthew became Director of the newly founded NSF-Simons Center for Quantitative Biology at Northwestern University. Co-funded by a public-private partnership between the National Science Foundation and Simons Foundation, the Center for Quantitative Biology contains 12 Northwestern faculty members who are experts in developmental biology, applied mathematics, and pure mathematics. The Center's mission is to greatly expand the application of mathematics to study of important questions in developmental biology. This is done by supporting interdisciplinary research within the Center and stimulating interdisciplinary research and training activities across the United States. These efforts are augmented by the efforts of three other NSF-Simons Centers located across the country.

== Selected publications ==
- Cassidy J.J.; Straughan A.J.; Carthew R.W. (February 2016). "Differential Masking of Natural Genetic Variation by miR-9a in Drosophila". Genetics. 202 (2): 675–87. doi:10.1534/genetics.115.183822. PMC 4788242. PMID 26614743.
- Wu P-H.; Isaji M.; Carthew R.W. (October 10, 2013). "Functionally diverse microRNA effector complexes are regulated by extracellular signaling". Mol Cell. 52 (1): 113–23. doi:10.1016/j.molcel.2013.08.023. PMC 3797187. PMID 24055343.
