= Cracking the Code: Phil Sharp and the Biotech Revolution =

- Directed by: Bill Haney
- Produced by: Carina Chavda; Maura McCarthy Haney
- Narrated by: Mark Ruffalo
- Cinematography: Claudia Raschke
- Edited by: Shannon Conboy
- Music by: Craig Richey
- Production company: Uncommon Productions
- Distributed by: Dada Films
- Release date: September 26, 2025
- Running time: 97 minutes
- Country: United States
- Language: English

Cracking the Code: Phil Sharp and the Biotech Revolution is a 2025 American documentary film which explores the life of Nobel Prize winning geneticist and molecular biologist Phil Sharp. The film is directed by Bill Haney.
