= Uncommon Productions =

- Industry: Entertainment
- Founded: 2000
- Founder: Tim Disney Bill Haney
- Headquarters: Boston, MA Los Angeles, CA
- Key people: Tim Disney Bill Haney Maura McCarthy Haney
- Products: Film, Stage plays
- Website: www.uncommonproductions.com

Uncommon Productions, LLC is an independent film company based in Boston, Massachusetts and Los Angeles, California. Founded in 2000 by Bill Haney and Tim Disney, Uncommon's films tend to focus on social issues. Recent films include cancer immunotherapy documentary, Jim Allison: Breakthrough, mountain top removal documentary The Last Mountain featuring Robert Kennedy Jr., and the NAACP Image Award nominated drama American Violet about drug enforcement, starring Nicole Beharie, Anthony Mackie, Will Patton, Alfre Woodard, Tim Blake Nelson, and Charles S. Dutton.

In 2007 the owners of a Dominican Republic sugar plantation sued the company for defamation because of the way they were portrayed in the Uncommon Productions film The Price of Sugar. In August 2010, a Federal judge ruled in favor of the filmmakers.

== Filmography ==
=== Documentaries ===
- Cracking the Code: Phil Sharp and the Biotech Revolution (2025), a film about Nobel laureate Phillip Allen Sharp for his role in discovering RNA splicing, and narrated by Mark Ruffalo.
- Jim Allison: Breakthrough (2019) about Nobel laureate James P. Allison, which won the following awards: the 2020 AAAS Kavli Science Journalism Award, 2021 Award for Scientific Merit at the Scinema International Science Film Festival, and the 2019 "Golden Owl" award at the Bergen International Film Festival.
- The Last Mountain (2011), which received the Pare Lorentz Award
- The Price of Sugar (2007), which won the Emerging Visions audience award at SXSW
- A Life Among Whales (2005)
- Racing Against the Clock (2004)
- Gift of the Game (2002), which won the "Best of the Festival" award at the Woods Hole Film Festival

=== Feature films ===
- What We Find on the Road (2024)
- William (2019)
- American Violet (2008)
- Crusade: A March Through Time (2006)
- Tempesta (2005)
- A Question of Faith (2000)

== Theater ==
In 2024, Uncommon Productions made its theatrical debut with The Poisoner, staged at the renowned La MaMa Experimental Theatre Club in New York City. The Poisoner, written by M. M. Haney, was inspired by the Flint water crisis, and is a cautionary tale unraveling of the deception, abuse of power, and utter negligence of early 2000’s Midwestern water politics.
