= Francisco Ozoria Acosta =

Dominican prelate of the Catholic Church (born 1951)

- Archbishop of Santo Domingo
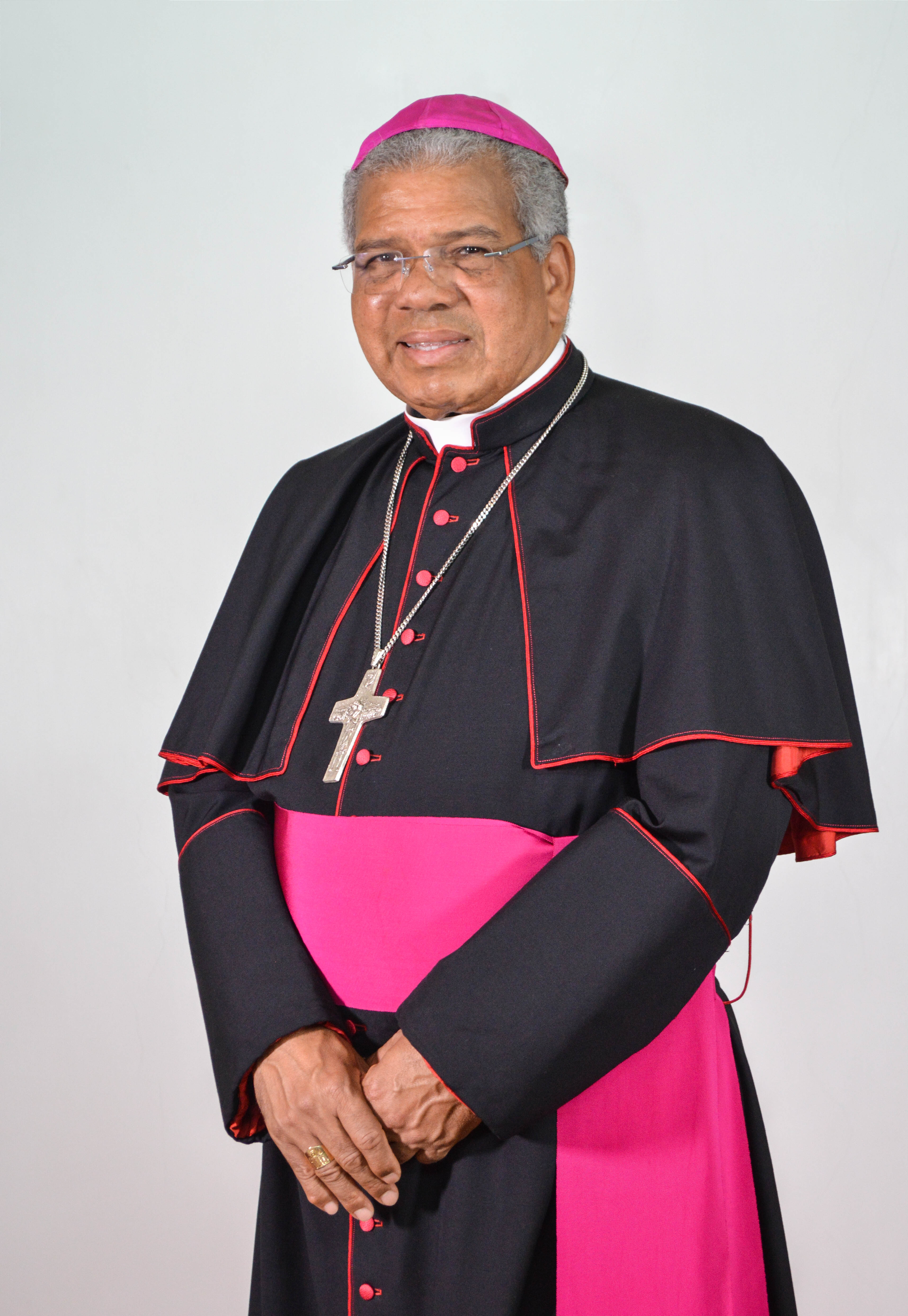
- Church: Catholic
- Archdiocese: Santo Domingo
- Appointed: 4 July 2016
- Installed: 10 September 2016
- Predecessor: Nicolás de Jesús López Rodríguez
- Other post: Military Ordinary of the Dominican Republic
- Previous post: Bishop of San Pedro de Macorís (1997–2016)

Orders
- Ordination: 2 September 1978 by Nicolás de Jesús López Rodríguez
- Consecration: 15 March 1997 by Nicolás de Jesús López Rodríguez

Personal details
- Born: 10 October 1951 (age 75) Nagua, Dominican Republic
- Education: Pontifical Seminary Saint Thomas Aquinas
- Motto: Dios proveerá ('God will provide')
- Signature: Francisco Ozoria Acosta's signature

- Coat of arms: Francisco Ozoria Acosta's coat of arms

Francisco Ozoria Acosta (born 10 October 1951) is a Dominican prelate of the Catholic Church who has been Archbishop of Santo Domingo since 2016 and Military Ordinary of the Dominican Republic since 2017. He was Bishop of San Pedro de Macorís from 1997 to 2016.

== Biography ==
=== Early years ===
Francisco Ozoria Acosta was born on 10 October 1951 in Nagua, Dominican Republic. His basic education took place at Escuela Primaria de Payita and at Mercedes Bello in Nagua and his secondary education at the Seminario Menor San Pío X in Licey al Medio, Santiago de los Caballeros, which he entered on 30 September 1967. He studied philosophy at the Pontificia Universidad Católica Madre y Maestra in Santiago de los Caballeros and theology in the Pontifical Seminary Saint Thomas Aquinas in Santo Domingo.

On 2 September 1978, he was ordained a priest and assigned to pastoral work in San Francisco de Macorís. Other postings included: diocesan director for priestly vocations, vice-rector and director of spiritual formation at Seminario Menor Santo Cura de Ars, La Vega (1978-1981), pastor of María Madre de la Iglesia de San Francisco de Macorís (1981-1988), and Pastoral Vicar. He was also pastor of San José de La Bomba de Cenoví, San Juan Bautista de Pimentel and of the Cathedral Santa Ana.

He earned his licentiate in pastoral theology at the Pontifical Lateran University in 1988. Beginning in 1990 he had responsibility for spiritual formation and was professor of pastoral theology at the Pontifical Seminary Saint Thomas Aquinas in Santo Domingo. In 1992 he was named pastor of the parishes of Santísima Trinidad and San Francisco de Asís in the “El Factor” neighborhood of Nagua and of Santiago Apóstol de Arroyo.

=== Bishop and Archbishop ===
On 1 February 1997, at the creation of the Diocese of San Pedro de Macorís, Pope John Paul II named him its bishop. He received his episcopal consecration on 15 March from Cardinal Nicolás de Jesús López Rodríguez, Archbishop of Santo Domingo. As bishop he built a strong reputation for developing vocations for the priesthood. In 2006, in an action that attracted press attention and political controversy, he ordered Christopher Hartley, a New York priest whose activism among Haitian immigrants he had long defended, to leave the diocese, apparently because Hartley had attempted to interfere in the process of episcopal appointments.

On 4 July 2016, Pope Francis named him Archbishop of Santo Domingo. His appointment was unexpected, as it moved him from a diocese with a population of a half million to another of five million and he was "barely known to the media". He described himself as "passionate follower of the Second Vatican Council, above all of the ecclesiology of communion that underpins our national pastoral program". He was installed in Santo Domingo on 10 September.

On 2 January 2017, Francis named him Military Ordinary of the Dominican Republic as well. He received the pallium that represents his status as a metropolitan archbishop from Francis on 30 June 2017.

Within the Dominican Episcopal Conference he was, from 2008 to 2014, president of the commissions on international Eucharistic Congresses, on the pastoral care of migrants, and on the Haitian pastorate. Since 2014 he has headed the commissions on the laity and on youth.

Ozoria is the Grand Prior of the Dominican Republic Magistral Delegation of the Equestrian Order of the Holy Sepulchre of Jerusalem, which was established in 2024.

Catholic Church titles
New title	Bishop of San Pedro de Macorís; 1997-2016	Succeeded by Santiago Rodríguez Rodríguez
Preceded by Nicolás de Jesús López Rodríguez	Archbishop of Santo Domingo; 2016-present	Incumbent
Preceded by Nicolás de Jesús López Rodríguez	Military Ordinariate of the Dominican Republic; 2017-present	Incumbent
