= Military Ordinariate of the Dominican Republic =

Catholic ecclesiastical jurisdiction in the Dominican Republic

Military Bishopric of the Dominican Republic Militaris Reipublicae Dominicianae Obispado Castrense de República Dominicana

Location
- Country: Dominican Republic

Information
- Denomination: Roman Catholic
- Rite: Latin Rite
- Established: 23 January 1958 (68 years ago)

Current leadership
- Pope: Leo XIV
- Bishop: Francisco Ozoria Acosta
- Bishops emeritus: Nicolás de Jesús López Rodríguez

The Military Bishopric of the Dominican Republic (Spanish: Obispado Castrense de República Dominicana) is a military ordinariate (quasi-diocese) of the Roman Catholic Church.

It is exempt, i.e. immediately subject to the Holy See, not part of any ecclesiastical province.

Its Cathedral Church is the Catedral Castrense Santa Bárbara de los hombres de la mar, a colonial Eclectic Catholic cathedral located in the Ciudad Colonial of Santo Domingo, in the Dominican Republic.

== Statistics ==
As per 2014 it provides pastoral care to Roman Catholics serving in the Armed Forces of the Dominican Republic and their families in 47 (garrison?) parishes with 64 priests (62 diocesan, 2 religious) and 2 lay religious brothers.

== History ==
- It was established as Military Vicariate of Dominican Republic on 23 January 1958 and elevated on 21 July 1986 to Military Ordinariate of Dominican Republic.
- It remains generally vested in the national capital's primatial Archdiocese of Santo Domingo, being headquartered in the archbishopric (apparently using its cathedral as see), but can be retained longer than the Metropolitan office.

== Episcopal ordinaries ==
(all Roman Rite)

Military Vicars of the Dominican Republic

- Ricardo Pittini Piussi, Salesians of Don Bosco (S.D.B.) (Italian) (1958 – death 10 December 1961), while Metropolitan Archbishop of Santo Domingo (Dominican Republic) (1935.10.11 – 1961.12.10), President of Dominican Episcopal Conference (1958 – 1961.12.10)
- Octavio Antonio Beras Rojas (8 December 1962 – retired 1982) while Metropolitan Archbishop of Santo Domingo (1961.12.10 – 1981.11.15), created Cardinal-Priest of S. Sisto (1976.05.24 – 1990.12.01); previously Titular Archbishop of Euchaitæ (1945.05.02 – 1961.12.10) as Coadjutor Archbishop of Santo Domingo (Dominican Republic) (1945.05.02 – 1961.12.10), Apostolic Administrator of Santiago de los Caballeros (Dominican Republic) (1953 – 1956.07.22), Apostolic Administrator sede plena of Santo Domingo (Dominican Republic) (1960 – 1961.12.10), President of Dominican Episcopal Conference (1961–1979), Apostolic Administrator of the Military Vicariate of Dominican Republic (1961.12.10 – 1962.12.08)
- Nicolás de Jesús López Rodríguez (4 April 1982 – 21 July 1986 see below), while Metropolitan Archbishop of Santo Domingo (1981.11.15 – 2016.07.04); previously Bishop of San Francisco de Macorís (Dominican Republic) (1978.01.16 – 1981.11.15)

Military Ordinaries of the Dominican Republic

- Nicolás de Jesús López Rodríguez (see above 21 July 1986 – retired 1 January 2017), President of Dominican Episcopal Conference (1984–2002), First Vice-President of Latin American Episcopal Council (1987–1991), President of Latin American Episcopal Council (1991–1995), created Cardinal-Priest of S. Pio X alla Balduina (1991.06.28 – ...), President of Dominican Episcopal Conference (2009 – 2014.07.04)
- Francisco Ozoria Acosta (2 January 2017 – ...), while Metropolitan Archbishop of Santo Domingo (2016.07.04 – ...); previously Bishop of San Francisco de Macorís (Dominican Republic) (1997.02.01 – 2016.07.04).

== Sources and external links ==
- Historia del Ordinatario Castrense (Episcopal Conference of the Dominican Republic)
- Military Ordinariate of Dominican Republic (Catholic-Hierarchy)
