= Octavio Beras Rojas =

Dominican cardinal

His Eminence Octavio Beras Rojas
- Archbishop Emeritus of Santo Domingo
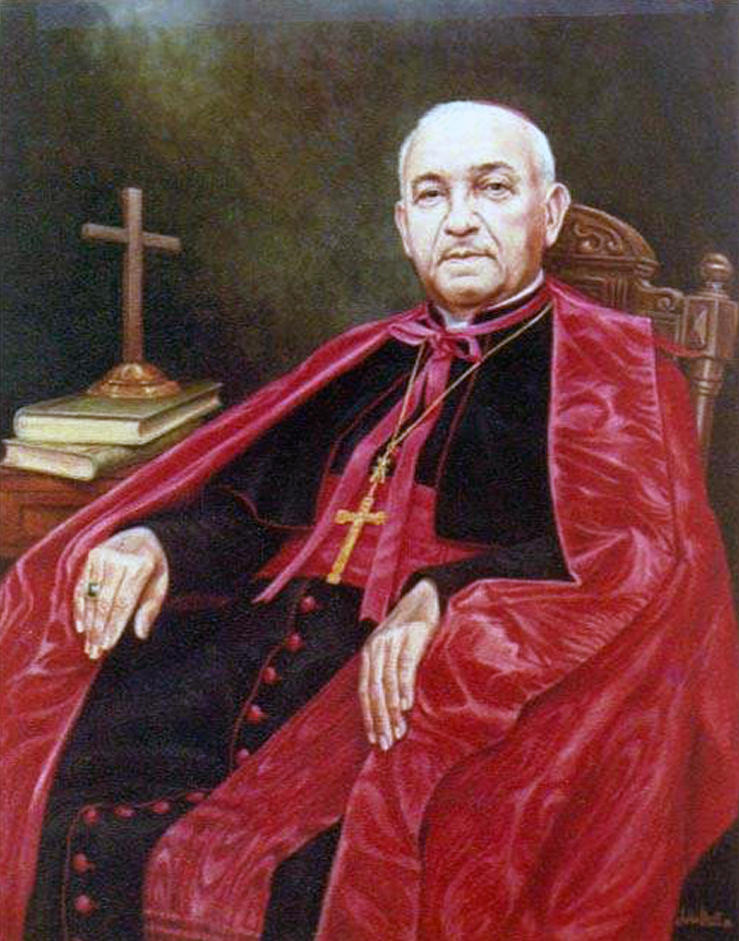
- Church: Roman Catholic Church
- Archdiocese: Santo Domingo
- See: Santo Domingo
- Appointed: 10 December 1961
- Term ended: 15 November 1981
- Predecessor: Ricardo Pittini
- Successor: Nicolás de Jesús López Rodríguez
- Other post: Cardinal-Priest of San Sisto (1976-90)
- Previous posts: Titular Archbishop of Euchaitae (1945-61); Coadjutor Archbishop of Santo Domingo (1945-61); Apostolic Administrator of Santiago de los Caballeros (1953-56); Apostolic Administrator sede plena of Santo Domingo (1960-61); President of the Dominican Episcopal Conference (1961-79); Apostolic Administrator of the Military Vicariate of the Dominican Republic (1961-62); Military Vicar of the Dominican Republic (1962-82

Orders
- Ordination: 13 August 1933
- Consecration: 12 August 1945 by Manuel Arteaga y Betancourt
- Created cardinal: 24 May 1976 by Pope Paul VI
- Rank: Cardinal-Priest

Personal details
- Born: Octavio Antonio Beras Rojas; 16 November 1906 Saint Lucía, El Seibo, Dominican Republic
- Died: 1 December 1990 (aged 84) Santo Domingo, Dominican Republic
- Education: Pontifical Gregorian University
- Motto: In hoc signo vinces

- Coat of arms

Styles of Octavio Beras Rojas
- Reference style: His Eminence
- Spoken style: Your Eminence
- Informal style: Cardinal
- See: Santo Domingo (emeritus)

Octavio Antonio Beras Rojas (16 November 1906 – 1 December 1990) was a Dominican cardinal of the Roman Catholic Church. He served as Archbishop of Santo Domingo from 1961 to 1981, and was elevated to the cardinalate in 1976.

== Biography ==
Octavio Beras Rojas was born in Santa Lucía, in El Seibo Province, as the eldest of the three children of Octavio Beras Zorrilla, congressman and governor of El Seibo, and Teresa Rojas Santana (a great-granddaughter of Ramón Santana). He received his first Communion from Archbishop Adolfo Alejandro Nouel, and studied at the Seminary of St. Thomas Aquinas, in Santo Domingo from 1923 to 1926. He was then sent to Rome, where he studied at the Pontifical Gregorian University whilst residing at the Pontifical Collegio Pio Latino Americano.

Later returning to the Santo Domingo seminary for health reasons, Beras was ordained to the priesthood on 13 August 1933 and then did pastoral work in Santiago de los Caballeros until 1935, whence he was transferred to Santo Domingo. Whilst there, from 1935 to 1945, he served successively as secretary general of archdiocese; director of the ecclesiastical bulletin, weekly newspaper Verdad Católica, and of the Catholic radio station; president of the ecclesiastical tribunal; and organizer of the archdiocesan synod. He also founded the Federation of Catholic Youth, and was named an honorary canon of the metropolitan chapter, pro-vicar general, and pastor of the metropolitan cathedral.

On 2 May 1945 Beras was appointed Coadjutor Archbishop of Santo Domingo and Titular Archbishop of Euchaitae by Pope Pius XII. He received his episcopal consecration on the following 12 August from Archbishop Manuel Arteaga y Betancourt, with Archbishop Enrique Pérez Serantes and Bishop Aloysius Willinger, CSSR, serving as co-consecrators. After becoming Apostolic Administrator sede plena of Santo Domingo, Beras acted as the secretary general of the first conference of the Latin American Episcopal Conference, from 25 July to 2 August 1955, in Rio de Janeiro, Brazil.

He later succeeded the late Ricardo Pittini Piussi, SDB, as Archbishop of Santo Domingo, and thus Primate of the Dominican Republic, on 10 December 1961. Beras was appointed Military Vicar for the Dominican Republic on 8 December 1962, and was a member of the Central Preparatory Commission of the Second Vatican Council from 1962 to 1965. In 1965, he was also made President of the Episcopal Conference of Dominican Republic.

Pope Paul VI created him Cardinal Priest of S. Sisto in the consistory of 24 May 1976. Beras, the first cardinal from the Dominican Republic, was one of the cardinal electors who participated in the conclaves of August and October 1978, which selected Popes John Paul I and John Paul II respectively. He resigned as his post as Archbishop on 15 November 1981, after nearly twenty years of service, and his post in the military vicariate a year later, on 15 November 1982. Beras lost the right to participate in any conclaves upon reaching the age of eighty on 16 November 1986.

The Cardinal died in Santo Domingo, at age 84. He is buried at the primatial and metropolitan cathedral of the same, the Catedral de Santa María la Menor.

Ancestors of Octavio Beras Rojas

16. Francisco de Veras
8. José Veras Díaz
17. Felicita Díaz
4. Andrés Beras Trinidad (1841–?)
18. Salvador Trinidad
9. Juana Trinidad del Rosario
19. Ana del Rosario
2. Octavio Beras Zorrilla (1877–?)
10, Julián Zorrilla Betancourt
21, Jacinta Betancourt
5. Ana Zorrilla Álvarez
22, Isidro Álvarez
11, Altagracia Álvarez Cordero
23, Petronila Cordero
1. Octavio Antonio Beras Rojas (1906–1990)
6. José Ramón Rojas Duchesne
3. Teresa Armanda Rojas Santana
28. Ramón Santana Familia (1801–1844)
14. Rafael Santana Febles
29. Froilana Febles Rivera
7. Francisca 'Anita' Santana Bobadilla
30. Emilio Bobadilla
15. Paula Bobadilla de Castro
31. Candelaria de Castro

Source: Carlos Larrazábal Blanco. Familias Dominicanas.

Catholic Church titles
Preceded by Ricardo Pittini Piussi, SDB	Archbishop of Santo Domingo; 1961–1981	Succeeded by Nicolás de Jesús López Rodríguez
Preceded by Ricardo Pittini Piussi, SDB	Military Vicar of the Dominican Republic; 1962–1982	Succeeded by Nicolás de Jesús López Rodríguez
