= Phillip Allen Sharp =

American geneticist and molecular biologist

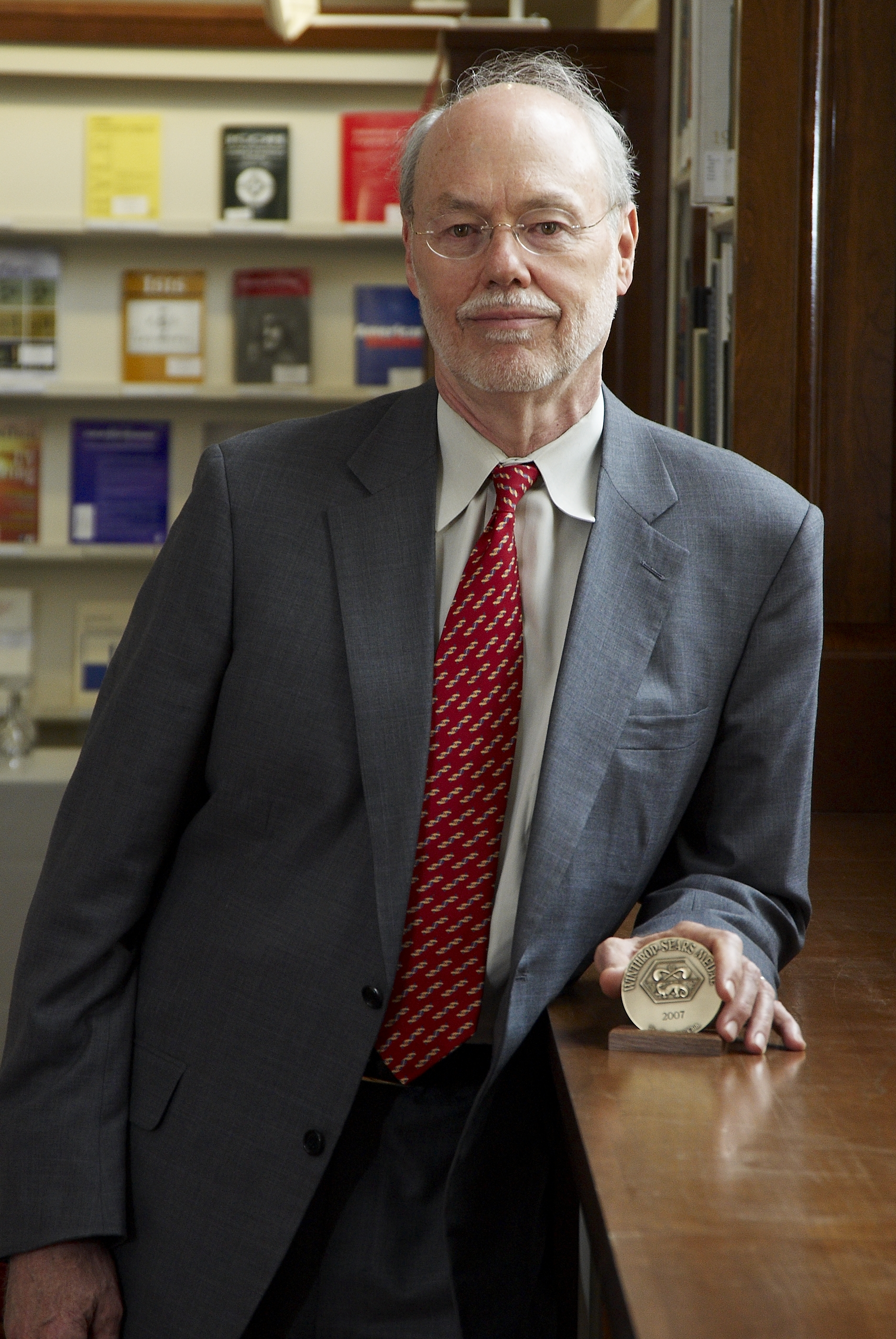
- Sharp with the Winthrop-Sears Medal in 2007
- Born: June 6, 1944 (age 82); Falmouth, Kentucky, U.S.
- Education: Union Commonwealth University (BA); University of Illinois at Urbana–Champaign (PhD)
- Spouse: Ann Holcombe (m. 1964)
- Children: 3
- Awards: NAS Award in Molecular Biology (1980); Louisa Gross Horwitz Prize (1988); Dickson Prize (1991); Nobel Prize (1993); Novartis-Drew Award (2003); National Medal of Science (2004)
- Scientific career
- Fields: Biologist
- Workplaces: Caltech; Cold Spring Harbor Laboratory; MIT
- Doctoral students: Connie Cepko; Andrew Fire; Melissa J. Moore; Richard Carthew
- Website: web.mit.edu/sharplab

External videos
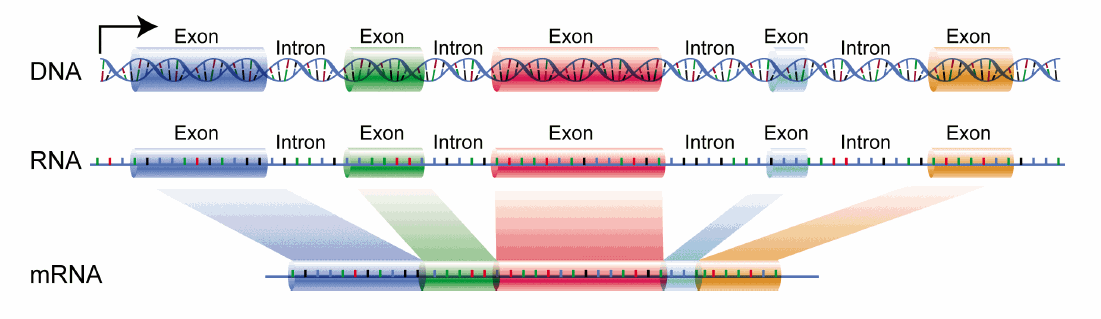
- Meet Phillip Sharp: "What we were able to discover was that in human cells and in many other cells of higher-order organisms, the genes come in discontinuous segments", MIT

Phillip Allen Sharp (born June 6, 1944) is an American geneticist and molecular biologist who co-discovered RNA splicing. He shared the 1993 Nobel Prize in Physiology or Medicine with Richard J. Roberts for "the discovery that genes in eukaryotes are not contiguous strings but contain introns, and that the splicing of messenger RNA to delete those introns can occur in different ways, yielding different proteins from the same DNA sequence". He was awarded the 2015 Othmer Gold Medal.

Sharp's current research focuses on small RNAs and other types of non-coding RNAs. His laboratory works to identify the target mRNAs of microRNAs (miRNAs), and has discovered a class of miRNAs that are produced from sequences adjacent to transcription start sites. His laboratory also studies how miRNA gene regulation functions in angiogenesis and cellular stress.

== Biography ==
Sharp was born in Falmouth, Kentucky, the son of Kathrin (Colvin) and Joseph Walter Sharp. He married Ann Holcombe in 1964, and they have three daughters.

Sharp studied at Union Commonwealth University, and majored in chemistry and mathematics, afterwards completing his Ph.D. in chemistry at the University of Illinois at Urbana-Champaign in 1969. Following his Ph.D., he did his postdoctoral training at the California Institute of Technology until 1971, where he studied plasmids. Later, he studied gene expression in human cells at the Cold Spring Harbor Laboratory as a senior scientist under James D. Watson.

In 1974, he was offered a position at MIT by biologist Salvador Luria. He was director of MIT's Center for Cancer Research (now the Koch Institute for Integrative Cancer Research) from 1985 to 1991; head of the Biology department from 1991 to 1999; and founder and director of the McGovern Institute for Brain Research from 2000 to 2004. In 1995, the FBI confirmed that Sharp received a letter from Ted Kaczynski, insinuating that Sharp would become a target of the Unabomber because of his work in genetics, stating that "it would be beneficial to your health to stop your research in genetics."

He is currently MIT Institute Professor and Professor of Biology Emeritus and member of the Koch Institute, and was an Institute Professor, MIT's highest faculty rank, since 1999. He is also the chair of the advisory board of the MIT Jameel Clinic. Sharp co-founded Biogen, Alnylam Pharmaceuticals, and Magen Biosciences, and has served on the boards of all three companies.

== Awards and honors ==
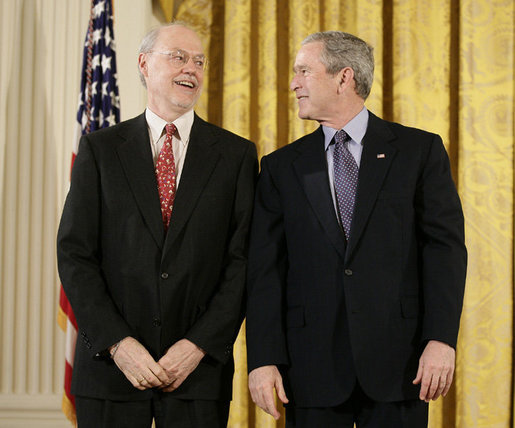
Phillip Sharp with George W. Bush, at the National Medal of Science awards in 2006.

In addition to the Nobel Prize, Sharp has won several notable awards, including the 2004 National Medal of Science, the 1999 Benjamin Franklin Medal for Distinguished Achievement in the Sciences of the American Philosophical Society, the Golden Plate Award of the American Academy of Achievement in 1981, and the 1988 Louisa Gross Horwitz Prize from Columbia University together with Thomas R. Cech.

Sharp is an elected member of several academic societies, including the American Academy of Arts and Sciences, the American Association for the Advancement of Science, the National Academy of Sciences, and the Institute of Medicine of the National Academies. He was elected a Foreign Member of the Royal Society (ForMemRS) in 2011. In 2012, he was elected the president of the American Association for the Advancement of Science. He is also a Member and Chair of the Scientific Advisory Board of Fidelity Biosciences Group; a member of the Board of Advisors of Polaris Venture Partners; chairman of the Scientific Advisory Board and member of the Board of Directors of Alnylam Pharmaceuticals; advisor and investor at Longwood and Polaris Venture Funds; a member of the Boards of Directors at Syros Pharmaceuticals and VIR Biotechnology; and member and Chair of the Scientific Advisory Board at Dewpoint Biotechnology.

He is the subject of the 2025 documentary film Cracking the Code: Phil Sharp and the Biotech Revolution, directed by Bill Haney.

Pendleton County, Kentucky, Sharp's birthplace, named its current middle school after him.

== Other activities ==
In October 2010, Sharp participated in the USA Science and Engineering Festival's Lunch with a Laureate program where middle and high school students got to engage in an informal conversation with a Nobel Prize-winning scientist over a brown-bag lunch. Sharp is also a member of the USA Science and Engineering Festival's Advisory Board. In 2011, he was listed at #5 on the MIT150 list of the top 150 innovators and ideas from MIT.

He is an editorial advisor to Xconomy, and is a member of the Board of Scientific Governors at The Scripps Research Institute. He has also served on the Faculty Advisory Board of the MIT-Harvard Research Journal and MIT Student Research Association.

In 2016, Sharp helped organize the Laureates Letter Supporting Precision Agriculture, written to oppose efforts by Greenpeace to ban GMOs and golden rice in particular.

== Selected publications ==
- Petersen C.P.; Bordeleau M.E.; Pelletier J.; Sharp P.A. (February 17, 2006). "Short RNAs Repress Translation after Initiation in Mammalian Cells". Mol Cell. 21 (4): 533–42. doi:10.1016/j.molcel.2006.01.031. PMID 16483934.
- Cheng C.; Sharp P.A. (January 2006). "Regulation of CD44 Alternative Splicing by SRm160 and its Potential Role in Tumor Cell Invasion". Mol Cell Biol. 26 (1): 362–70. doi:10.1128/MCB.26.1.362-370.2006. PMC 1317625. PMID 16354706.
- Tantin D.; Schild-Poulter C.; Wang V.; Hache R.J.; Sharp P.A. (December 1, 2005). "The Octamer Binding Transcription Factor Oct-1 is a Stress Sensor". Cancer Res. 65 (23): 10750–8. doi:10.1158/0008-5472.CAN-05-2399. PMID 16322220.
- Grishok A.; Sharp P.A. (November 29, 2005). "Negative Regulation of Nuclear Divisions in Caenorhabditis Elegans by Retinoblastoma and RNA Interference-related Genes". Proc Natl Acad Sci U S A. 102 (48): 17360–5. Bibcode:2005PNAS..10217360G. doi:10.1073/pnas.0508989102. PMC 1297700. PMID 16287966.
- Sharp P.A. (October 7, 2005). "1918 Flu and Responsible Science". Science. 310 (5745): 17. doi:10.1126/science.310.5745.17. PMID 16210500.
- Miskevich F.; Doench J.G.; Townsend M.T.; Sharp P.A.; Constantine-Paton M. (April 15, 2006). "RNA Interference of Xenopus NMDAR NR1 in vitro and in vivo". J Neurosci Methods. 152 (1–2): 65–73. doi:10.1016/j.jneumeth.2005.08.010. PMID 16182372. S2CID 25844342.
- Hong J.H.; Hwang E.S.; McManus M.T.; Amsterdam A.; Tian Y.; Kalmukova R.; Mueller E.; Benjamin T.; Spiegelman B.M.; Sharp P.A.; Hopkins N.; Yaffe M.B. (August 12, 2005). "TAZ, a Transcriptional Modulator of Mesenchymal Stem Cell Differentiation". Science. 309 (5737): 1074–8. Bibcode:2005Sci...309.1074H. doi:10.1126/science.1110955. PMID 16099986. S2CID 1958224.
- Houbaviy H.B.; Dennis L.; Jaenisch R.; Sharp P.A. (August 2005). "Characterization of a Highly Variable Eutherian microRNA Gene". RNA. 11 (8): 1245–57. doi:10.1261/rna.2890305. PMC 1370808. PMID 15987809.
- Sharp P.A. (June 2005). "The Discovery of Split Genes and RNA Splicing". Trends Biochem. Sci. 30 (6): 279–81. doi:10.1016/j.tibs.2005.04.002. PMID 15950867.
- Johnson D.M.; Yamaji S.; Tennant J.; Srai S.K.; Sharp P.A. (March 28, 2005). "Regulation of Divalent Metal Transporter Expression in Human Intestinal Epithelial Cells Following Exposure to Non-haem Iron". FEBS Lett. 579 (9): 1923–9. Bibcode:2005FEBSL.579.1923J. doi:10.1016/j.febslet.2005.02.035. PMID 15792797. S2CID 26592792.
- Neilson J.R.; Sharp P.A. (April 2005). "Herpesviruses Throw a Curve Ball: New Insights into microRNA Biogenesis and Evolution". Nat Methods. 2 (4): 252–4. doi:10.1038/nmeth0405-252. PMID 15782215. S2CID 930447.
- Grishok A.; Sinskey J.L.; Sharp P.A. (March 15, 2005). "Transcriptional Silencing of a Transgene by RNAi in the Soma of C. elegans". Genes Dev. 19 (6): 683–96. doi:10.1101/gad.1247705. PMC 1065722. PMID 15741313.
- Sharp P.A.; Sharp, P (January 1, 2005). "Phillip Sharp Discusses RNAi, Nobel Prizes and Entrepreneurial Science". Drug Discov Today. 10 (1): 7–10. doi:10.1016/S1359-6446(04)03329-X. PMID 15676292.
- Lee K.B.; Sharp P.A. (December 7, 2004). "Transcription-dependent Polyubiquitination of RNA Polymerase II Requires Lysine 63 of Ubiquitin". Biochemistry. 43 (48): 15223–9. doi:10.1021/bi048719x. PMID 15568815.
- Mansfield J.H.; Harfe B.D.; Nissen R.; Obenauer J.; Srineel J.; Chaudhuri A.; Farzan-Kashani R.; Zuker M.; Pasquinelli A.E.; Ruvkun G.; Sharp P.A.; Tabin C.J.; McManus M.T. (October 2004). "MicroRNA-responsive 'Sensor' Transgenes Uncover Hox-like and Other Developmentally Regulated Patterns of Vertebrate MicroRNA Expression". Nat. Genet. 36 (10): 1079–83. doi:10.1038/ng1421. PMID 15361871.
- Fairbrother W.G.; Holste D.; Burge C.B.; Sharp P.A. (September 2004). "Single Nucleotide Polymorphism-based Validation of Exonic Splicing Enhancers". PLOS Biol. 2 (9): E268. doi:10.1371/journal.pbio.0020268. PMC 514884. PMID 15340491.
- Novina C.D.; Sharp P.A. (July 8, 2004). "The RNAi Revolution". Nature. 430 (6996): 161–4. Bibcode:2004Natur.430..161N. doi:10.1038/430161a. PMID 15241403. S2CID 4341565.
- Ventura A.; Meissner A.; Dillon C.P.; McManus M.; Sharp P.A.; Van Parijs L.; Jaenisch R.; Jacks T. (July 13, 2004). "Cre-lox-regulated Conditional RNA Interference from Transgenes". Proc Natl Acad Sci U S A. 101 (28): 10380–5. Bibcode:2004PNAS..10110380V. doi:10.1073/pnas.0403954101. PMC 478580. PMID 15240889.

== See also ==
- History of RNA biology
- List of RNA biologists
- MIT Department of Biology
