= Diocese of San Pedro de Macorís =

Roman Catholic diocese in the Dominican Republic

Diocese of San Pedro de Macorís Dioecesis Sancti Petri de Macoris
- Coat of arms

Location
- Country: Dominican Republic
- Ecclesiastical province: Province of Santo Domingo
- Metropolitan: San Pedro de Macorís

Statistics
- Area: 2,588 km^{2} (999 sq mi)
- Population: Total; Catholics: (as of 2004); 581,000; 492,000 (84.7%)
- Parishes: 20

Information
- Denomination: Roman Catholic
- Rite: Latin Rite
- Established: 1 February 1997 (28 years ago)
- Cathedral: Cathedral of St. Peter the Apostle

Current leadership
- Pope: Leo XIV
- Bishop: Santiago Rodríguez Rodríguez

Map
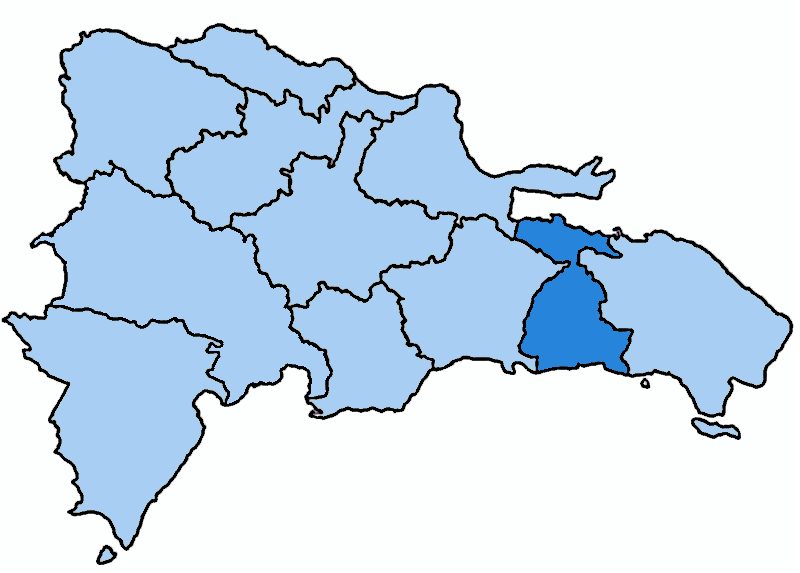

The Roman Catholic Diocese of San Pedro de Macorís (Latin: Dioecesis Sancti Petri de Macoris) (erected 1 February 1997) is a suffragan diocese of the Archdiocese of Santo Domingo.

== Ordinaries ==
- Francisco Ozoria Acosta (1 February 1997 – 2016), appointed Archbishop of Santo Domingo
- Santiago Rodríguez Rodríguez (2017 - )
